The following is a list of characters from Level-5's video game and anime franchise, Yo-kai Watch.

The version of the manga distributed in Southeast Asia (including the Philippines, Singapore, Malaysia, and Brunei) by Shogakukan Asia uses the original Japanese character names.

Main characters
Where available, names from the English games, North American English dub, and the North American English manga are on the left while the original Japanese names are on the right.

Main humans (Original series)
The five major humans are students of Springdale Elementary / . Nate (Keita), Bear (Kuma), Eddie (Kanchi), and Katie (Fumi-chan) are in Class 5-2. Only Hailey (Inaho) is in Class 5-1.

Nathan "Nate" Adams / 

The main protagonist of the series. Nate is an 11-year-old boy. He is able to do everything averagely, but this mediocrity bothers him. While his ability is mediocre, he is active and cheerful and does not receive aversion from classmates. He is also shown to be easily angered or embarrassed, shown by when Katie is forced by Tattletell to tell his friends that Nate used the bathroom to go number 2 (as it is referred to). While out in the forest, he happens upon a capsule machine standing under a sacred tree. Purchasing one of the capsules, he frees Whisper and is given the Yo-kai Watch, allowing him to see and befriend Yo-kai, as well as summon them into battle. He is the male protagonist of the games and the Shonen manga series. He has a secret love passion for Katie. In the shoujo manga series, he does not possess a Yo-kai Watch and is unaware of the presence of Yo-kai.

Katie Forester / 

Katie is a girl in Nate's class at school. She is highly intelligent, but is worried that she does not meet her mother's standards, and is often admired by her fellow male students, particularly Nate. She is the female protagonist in both the video games and the shoujo manga series. In contrast to Nate's watch, Katie's Yo-kai Watch is shaped like a pocket watch with a floral design, which Katie hangs around her neck. In the anime series, outside of a dream Whisper has in episode 67, she does not possess a Yo-kai Watch and is unaware of the presence of Yo-kai. Katie was featured in the Mini Corners where Kyubi tried to obtain her heart.

Barnaby "Bear" Bernstein / 

Nate's friend and classmate who appears intimidating, but is actually a very close friend. Bear is generous and easily moved to tears. Usually, he wears a blue jacket written as "BEARS 90".

Edward "Eddie" Archer / 

Nate's friend and classmate who is often seen hanging around Bear and wears headphones. He does not believe in the paranormal and is strong at devices. Eddie is a son of wealthy designers, but he does not boast of his family's wealth. He was born on November 21.

Hailey Anne Thomas / 

Hailey Anne is a young girl in Nate's school who is introduced in Yo-kai Watch 3 and the anime's second season. A sci-fi geek with an obsession with space, Hailey is tricked by Usapyon into buying the Yo-kai Watch U Prototype, and agrees to help Usapyon build a rocket to help his former owner Dr. Hughly's dreams come true. Afterwards, the two start a detective agency to investigate Yo-kai "crimes" in the city of Sparkopolis.

Main humans (Shadowside)
Summer Adams / 

The main protagonist in the movie, Yo-kai Watch Shadowside: Oni-ō no Fukkatsu. Summer is a junior high schooler and the daughter of Nate and Katie, and also Tate's sister, who nearly drowned in a river when she was young, but was rescued by a mysterious figure. She is chosen by the new Yo-Kai Watch, the Yo-Kai Watch Elder, allowing her to harness the power of summoning Yo-Kai. In the events of the fourth film, she fought the Demon King Rasen to protect both Yo-Kai and humans. She appeared again in the Shadowside anime series, running a Yo-Kai detective agency alongside Cole and Bruno.

Cole / 
 
Cole is a male junior high schooler whose parents were away overseas and was always alone as a result. Due to this, he is often bullied by his peers and harbors hatred towards everyone, never wanting to mingle with anyone. In the movie, he is cursed by one of Rasen's followers, bestowing him the Kigan Gear, an item used to spread evil and malice. Later in the film, the Kigan Gear transformed into the Yo-Kai Watch Ogre, allowing him to fight against the Onimaro and the Demon King. He is redeemed in the end of the film, and also appearing in the Shadowside anime series running a Yo-Kai Detective agency alongside Sumer and Bruno.

Bruno / 
 
Bruno is an apprentice shaman and the oldest of the Arihoshi siblings, who have used Yo-Kai in their fortune telling for many generations. Unlike Summer and Cole, he can use spells and incantations to take down Yo-Kai.

Tate Adams / 

Tate is one of the main protagonists of the Yo-Kai Watch: Shadowside series. He is Summer's younger brother and a fifth grade student who doesn't believe in supernatural phenomenona. In the film, he was cursed by the Onimaro virus, which turned him into a Kaodeka Oni. He is soon cured after Summer and Cole defeated the Demon King and eradicated the Onimaro virus from the city.

Main Yo-kai

Whisper is a Slippery tribe Yo-kai who became Nate’s self-appointed  butler after he freed him from the capsule he was imprisoned in. He helps Nate understand the Yo-kai World and its interactions with the human world. He often dismisses Nate's suspicions that a Yo-kai is involved with mysterious occurrences in his life, only to be proven wrong almost instantly. Following an incident with the Yo-kai Watch Type Zero, Nate can switch between the different Yo-kai Watch models by putting his arm inside Whisper's mouth. In the anime, it is revealed he is secretly a Yo-kai named Nonuttin ( in Japan), whose belches cause people to claim to know all about things when they actually have no idea.

Jibanyan is a Charming Tribe cat Yo-kai, specifically a nekomata, who is the ghost of a cat called Rudy ( in the Japanese version), the pet of a teenager named Amy (Emi "Emi-chan") until he died after being hit by a truck while crossing an intersection. He has since become a residual haunting and possesses people to make them cross the street without waiting for the signal so he can make another failed attempt to fight the cars to avenge his death. When Nate believes that Jibanyan is brave for his actions, Jibanyan is surprised and overwhelmed with joy, forming a friendship with Nate. He later ends up staying at Nate's house, where he often spends his time eating chocolate bars or worshipping his favorite idol group, Next Harmeowny. Jibanyan had initially assumed that Amy called him lame for dying, but after being sent back in time by the evil Yo-Kai duo Kin and Gin, he learns that she was actually referring to herself, as Rudy's death was really the result of saving Amy from getting hit by the truck as she crossed the intersection to meet with her friends. Jibanyan can transform into different Yo-kai under certain circumstances. While possessed by Roughraff, Jibanyan is turned into the bōsōzoku-inspired Baddinyan who thinks he is doing bad things, but is not that effective in scaring Nate. When he gets a cold, he becomes , turning green and growing cactus-like spikes that shoot out whenever he sneezes. In Yo-kai Watch 2, he can fuse with Whisper to create . When Nate received the Legendary Yo-Kai metal for a Yo-Kai named Shogunyan, Jibanyan becomes possessed by its spirit, forcing Jibanyan to take on the appearance of a Samurai.

A Charming Tribe lion dog Yo-kai from the countryside who Nate and Whisper meet while he is visiting the city for the first time. He is Komajiro’s brother. The shrine he used to guard got knocked down for construction and he tries to adapt to life in the city, but is overwhelmed by the sights and sounds as well as his love for soft serve ice cream. He is featured prominently in the anime and is one of the main protagonists of the Yo-kai Watch Busters games. In the anime, his "Mini Corner" segments have him still adapting to life in the city while doing other things like working in a toy company and falling in love with a manga artist.

Komasan's younger brother, also Charming tribe. He is much more outgoing and ready to experience the city than Komasan and is in fact much better at adapting to city life than his older brother.

Usapyon / 
 (Japanese); Katie Leigh (Season 3), Danilo Diniz (Season 3 - Portuguese), Melissa Hutchison (Blasters) (English)
A Shady Tribe Yo-kai from America who brings Hailey Anne into the world of Yo-kai. Although he wears a rabbit-shaped astronaut suit, he is not actually a rabbit and looks nothing like one underneath the suit; the rabbit ears are just part of his helmet. Whenever Hailey Anne pushes him too far, he activates his  and starts firing his laser gun everywhere. In his past life, Usapyon was a supposed otter called , who was taken in by a rocket scientist named Dr. Hughly and poised to be the first small animal to survive going into space, only to be killed in a rocket malfunction he himself caused. Now as a Yo-kai, Usapyon wants to make Dr. Hughly's dream a reality by making a new rocket powered by various Yo-kai Medals, seeking out Hailey Anne's help in order to build it.

Recurring Yo-kai
The following Yo-kai make recurring appearances in the anime, sometimes receiving their own story arcs.

Robonyan / Robonyan F / Robonyan F-gata 

A Tough tribe robot cat Yo-kai from the future, having been created after Jibanyan roboticized himself. While he can detach his paws to perform a rocket punch, his body also contains a chocolate bar factory. While he stays Nate's house, he runs up the electric bill when he charges up overnight much to the anger of Nate's mother. After meeting his future counterpart who sacrificed himself to save the planet from a meteor, Robonyan upgrades himself to match his form, becoming Robonyan F.

Blizzaria / Fubuki-hime / Blizzie / Fubuki-chan 

A Charming tribe fair-skinned humanoid Yo-kai based on the yuki-onna who is evolved from Frostina by fusing her with the Glacial Clip. Blizzaria is one of Mr. Crabbycat's colleagues at the Yo-kai school in the Mr. Crabbycat series of shorts. Outside of it, she brings a freezing blizzard everywhere she goes. Strongly believing there should be no discrimination of hot or cold types, she constantly attempts to hang out with Swelterrier's gang of Heat-type Yo-kai, unaware of how much they suffer from her freezingness.

Blazion / 

A Brave tribe lion-like Yo-kai that makes people more energetic and want to win things that otherwise are not contests. Blazion possessed Nate and his friends at a park clean-up field trip, but Hungramps and Happierre managed to bring things back to normal.

Hidabat / 

A Shady tribe bat Yo-kai that would rather spend its time indoors and never go out, forcing people to feel the same way. Whisper notes that Hidabat is famous lately. Hidabat appears in Nate's room, making Jibanyan feel like staying inside forever, and locking Nate out. After Jibanyan is forced out by Happierre and Dismarelda, Fidgephant is used to drive Hidabat out of Jibanyan and Hidabat admits that he is just afraid of going outside. Nate allows Hidabat to stay in his room and Hidabat gives Nate his Yo-kai Medal out of gratitude.

Shogunyan / 

A Legendary samurai Yo-kai of the Brave Tribe who is Jibanyan's Edo period ancestor. Whenever Nate calls on Shogunyan, Jibanyan is possessed by his ancestor's spirit. Shogunyan and Jibanyan are proven to be two different Yo-kai as they appear alongside each other in the anime episodes and movies.

A Merican Charming tribe cat Yo-kai from the United States. He has the ability to Americanize people he possesses. He has a belly band which models on the Stars and Stripes, and speaks with "meow" in the ending. He is a fan of Lady Nyanya. Tomnyan and Jibanyan are similar in their appearance and history of occurrences.

The Last Nyanmurai / 
A Merican Legendary samurai cat Yo-kai of the Brave Tribe. He is a recolored eyepatch-wearing version of Shogunyan. He incorrectly learns about Japan via Tomnyan.

Venoct / 

A powerful Slippery tribe Yo-kai who is seeking a powerful opponent to fight. It appears in Springdale seeking out the powerful Rubeus J who attacked his village but mistakes Jibanyan for his target. He manages to defeat Rubeus J who tells Venoct that Hardy Hound is stronger than him. When Venoct was learning about Hardy Hound's description, Nate, Whisper, and Jibanyan noticed that Komasan was nearby.

A Mysterious tribe  Yo-kai who figuratively steals women's hearts through sheer charm. In his "Mini Corner" segments, Kyubi attempts to steal Katie's heart, transforming into a charming boy, but Katie is immune to Kyubi's charms and it seems that he is instead falling for her. Nate later meets Kyubi in episode 31.

Roughraff / 

A Tough tribe mischievous /lizard Yo-kai with a large pompadour. He has the ability to bring out rudeness in people he possesses, turning Eddie into a delinquent and Jibanyan into the rude Yo-kai Baddinyan. He is ultimately impressed by Manjimutt's fighting skills, ending his reign of terror in the town and befriending Nate.

Manjimutt / 

An Eerie tribe dog Yo-kai who was once a human salaryman until he got drunk one night and died being crushed by several boards, alongside a toy poodle, transforming him into a man-faced toy poodle. Due to the circumstances of his death, he can be seen by people without a Yo-kai Watch. His resemblance to a human gets him in trouble with the police after he is found urinating in public, and then claims to be a dog. Manjimutt has his own featurette in some episodes following his appearance, often starting a new job to fill his time only to be arrested at the end for his troublemaking. This has included owning a high fashion salon that only dogs would attend, becoming a photographer, becoming a pastry chef, making pottery, wanting to go to Hollywood, and becoming a movie superhero. However, he is arrested and imprisoned on Alcatraz where he plots his escape. By episode 32, Manjimutt somehow got out of Alcatraz where he got scared away by Nate who was wanting to be in a magazine. In episode 41, Manjimutt was summoned by Nate to help deal with Shmoopie.

Hovernyan / 

A Brave tribe cat Yo-kai who is Nathaniel's friend. He wears a transforming hero's belt and a cape. Among cat Yo-kai, exceptionally Hovernyan has complete ears. When he powers up, he transforms into Darknyan of the Eerie tribe.

Lord Enma / 
A humanoid Yo-kai of the Enma tribe who is the leader of all Yo-kai. He seeks to unite the human world and the Yo-kai World.

Zazel / 

A boss Yo-kai of the shady tribe who is the head of the Yo-kai Council. He used to be a misanthrope when Aristokat and Duke Doggy worked for him. Zazel is Lord Enma's right-hand man.

Sergeant Burly / 

A human-like Oni Yo-kai of the Brave tribe who is obsessed with exercise, putting people and Yo-kai through his "Burly's Boot Camp". Sergeant Burly is also one of the performers of the anime's second ending theme. He first appeared where he inspirited Whisper to exercise with positive results. After giving Nate his Yo-kai Medal, Sergeant Burly then proceeded to do the same thing to Nate and Jibanyan. Sergeant Burly later encountered Nate where he and Sergeant Slug urged him to grow as an individual by having him try to confront Gargaros.

Sighborg Y / 
A humanoid robot Yo-kai of the Wandroid Tribe.

Koma Knomads / KK Brothers

Knomad Koma and Knomad Jiro are Merican Yo-kai of the Charming Tribe. They are recolored versions of Komasan and Komajiro.

Minor characters

Nate's classmates
Sarah / 
 (Japanese) Stephanie Sheh (English)
Katie's closest friend. Except the quartet composed of Nate, Katie, Bear, and Eddie, Sarah is the most frequent character among classmates of the second class of fifth grade.

Eric /  
A fifth grade boy who wears a blue headband, has his eyes glued shut and is the best dancer in Nate's class.

Stephen / 

A bespectacled boy that wears a yellow shirt who is the class president of the second class of fifth grade.

Mark / 
A boy who is a member of the Springdale Detective Kids Team. One of his eyes is covered by his hair.

Kenny / 
A tan-skinned kid with a shaved head.

Matt / 
A boy that wears a yellow bandana.

Andy / 
 (Japanese) Paul Greenberg (English)
A naughty boy wearing an adhesive plaster on the nose. Alongside Mark and Daniel, he is a member of the Springdale Detective Kids Team where he is their leader.

Daniel Anderson 
A boy who is a member of the Springdale Detective Kids Team.

Casey /  
A boy who has an only missing tooth. His nickname is "Hidepon".

Alex / 

A girl who usually hangs out with Katie.

Shelly / 

A quiet shy girl in Nate's class.

Lulu / 

Bear's girlfriend who has a candy-shaped hair decoration.

Natalie "Nat" / Norika Nakajima
 (English)
A girl who is the biggest girl in Nate's class.

Chelsea / Chiyo Suzuki
A girl who sometimes hangs out with Katie.

Lina / Rina Maeda
A blue-haired girl whose hair covers her eyes. She is friends with Zoey due to their mutual love for anything that is supernatural and/or spooky.

Megan "Meg" Jones / Megumi Sasaki
A girl who is seen sitting with Nate, Bear, and Eddie in class.
Voiced by: Ryōko Nagata (Japanese) Melissa Hutchison (English)
Maya / Mai Fujimoto
A girl that sports a ponytail and a leopard print t-shirt.

Zoey / Shizuka Sakai
A girl who is friends with Lina due to their mutual love for anything that is supernatural and/or spooky.

Lucas / Mao Hikage
A mysterious looking boy who is the son of Lord Enma. He is actually a yokai that takes the form of a human himself.

Hailey's classmates
Jessica Stonewood / Yuka Ishinomori

Hailey Anne's closest friend.

Isabelle / Kirara Hoshikaze

A wealthy and pretentious girl.

Chloe / Junko Hazawa

Isabelle's brown-haired friend and cohort.

Sydney / Masako Mozu

Isabelle's black-haired friend and cohort.

Other humans
Lily Adams / 

Nate's mother who is often quite strict with both him and her husband when they either anger her in some way or don't do what she tells them to do.

Aaron Adams / 

Nate's father. He is a white-collar worker who is often kind-hearted.

Mr. Joe Johnson / 

Nate, Katie, Bear, and Eddie's homeroom teacher.

Amy / Emi-chan
 (English)
Jibanyan's former owner when he was alive as Rudy. It was shown that Rudy died protecting Amy from an approaching truck and become Jibanyan.

Jerry

Tomnyan's owner and Nate's next door neighbor. He wears Nate's first Yo-kai Watch, but he cannot summon a Yo-kai properly. He also eats every food with maple syrup.

Phonius / Korinai Yarase

A director who met Komasan and Komajiro when he was in a museum observing dinosaurs which led to him starting the "Kaptain Komasan" series. Later, he met Inaho and USApyon and the two humans worked together create photos of supernatural stuff via Yo-kai. Phonius is also similar to Nezumi-otoko from Gegege no kitaro.

Nathaniel Adams / 

Nate's grandfather born in 1943. Nate meets in the past during the events of Yo-kai Watch 2 and the first movie. He is a fan of a movie character "Moximus Mask." It is revealed that he created the first Yo-kai Watch so that humans and Yo-kai could interact with each other.

Lucy Loo Adams / 

Nate's grandmother. A villager of Kemamoto (毛馬本).

Next HarMEOWny / 

A local idol group who dress up as catgirls and are Jibanyan's favorite group. Some of the members are shown to be able to see Yo-kai even if they are cat Yo-kai. The Japanese name is a parody of the idol group AKB48 and is voiced by members of AKB48, SKE48, and HKT48. The English dub name is a parody of R&B girl group Fifth Harmony.

Agents Blunder and Folly/ Agents Mulder and Kacully
Special agents from America that are parodies of the main protagonists of The X-Files.

Buck/ Wyatt / Mac
Nate's friend from the United States in Yo-kai Watch 3.

Joshua Thomas / Riku Misora
Hailey Anne's younger brother.

Rebecca Forester / Fumika's Mother
Katie's mother.

Jason Forester / Fumika's Father
Katie's father.

Kenny Forester / Fumiaki Kodama
Katie's grandfather.

Kazuo Emon
Inaho, Yuka, and Kirara, Junko, and Masako's homeroom teacher of Class 5-1.

Bearmie
Bear's younger sister who came from America.

Dorothy
Mac's older sister.

Dr. Hughly / 

Dr. Hughly is an astrophysicist who worked at NASU's Johnson Space Center on rockets. He is the one who found Chibi, now USApyon, and decided that he would become the first small animal to go to space. However, during the final test of the rocket, Chibi escaped his cage and caused the whole rocket to explode, killing Chibi and crushing Dr. Hughly's dreams. Now a Yo-kai, USApyon tracks him from the United States to Japan where he is trying to recover from the depression as a result of the explosion. Through the help of other Yo-kai, USApyon and Hailey Anne complete a rocket and while Dr. Hughly is watching send it off into the stratosphere. Dr. Hughly then tells Hailey Anne that she is amazed at what she did, even after she has him put on the Yo-kai Watch U Prototype to see USApyon, but he must still build his own rocket, and he apparently cannot see USApyon at all. After USApyon runs off, realizing he's done his job in inspiring Dr. Hughly, Hailey Anne confronts the professor on why he lied about not being able to see USApyon, and he reveals he has been able to see Yo-kai all along and USApyon has successfully inspired him to make a rocket that will go into space, even if he no longer has his friend Chibi to go with him.

Mr. Batham / Gatarou Gaman

An old man that made different appearances on the show. He is first seen when he turns up the temperature at the hot spring to a hotter temperature enough for Sproink to retreat since the current temperature wasn't warm enough. Gatarou then appeared twice as the studio producer for Directator. When Nate was dealing with Failian, Gatarou Gaman was among the people he inspirited. He is also revealed to be Enduriphant's instructor alongside the other Fidgephants that he trained.

Paranormal Expert / Exorcist

An old man whose exorcising ways are not liked by Nate and his Yo-kai friends.

Shogun Waitington / Ishida Mitsunari
Shogun Waitington was a samurai and military commander of the Sengoku period in Japan back when Whisper was known as Nonuttin.

Brenda
K-Koma's girlfriend.

Emily
Tomnyan's previous owner who is a lot like Amy in Similar appearance.

Yuto Arima

A boy which appears in the first part of the second movie. He is portrayed as downcast for his hard school life and decides to end his own life. Nate, as Fuu 2, contacts him and manages to get him hold into his dreams of being a manga artist.

Dr. Francesca Stein / Dr. Francine
A scientist who appears in Zombie Night and gives a mallet to help Nate fight the Zombies.

Mr. Balton / Science Teacher
Nate's science teacher.

Mr. Thatcet

A toy company president who is formerly the boss to Komasan in season 1. He also has a rebellious daughter who hangs out at the club Komajiro used to work as a DJ.

Arnold
Bearmie's older boyfriend who resembles Arnold Schwarzenegger.

Nick Nack
The owner of the Memory Store who gives Nate/Katie the Yo-Kai Watch in Yo-kai Watch 2.

Charlie

Manjimutt's enemy during his stay at Alcatraz and a serial killer.

Sarah / Hungramps' Granddaughter
The granddaughter of Hungramps when he was still human.
Voiced by: Yurie Kobori (Japanese); Kathryn Lynn (English)
Mr. Oda / Detective Holdit
A police officer who wants the player to defeat the Wanted Yo-Kai.

Kanami Minami
A mysterious girl from a parallel world who appears in the 3rd movie. She was a promising ballet dancer until she suffered an accident which halted her dreams. To somehow relieve herself and begin dancing again, she summons the Yo-kai Hogewhale and causes a disruption between her world and Nate's world using its powers, allowing herself to dance in Nate's world. Nate prompts her to recapacitate after defeating the whale Yo-kai's second form, Kujiraman.

Professor Daimon / Professor Diana Gately
A female researcher in Yo-kai Watch 2 which prompts the player to collect the Orbs found in the Gates of Whimsy to help her in her research. This allows the player to battle the Boss Eyephoon.

Mr Zen
An old Buddhist monk which allows the player to fuse some Yo-kai with items or other Yo-kai to cause them to evolve.

Dorian sato / Groovalicius
A dancing celebrity which changes the player's Yo-kai's victory poses by teaching them to dance in exchange for Dancing Stars in the games.

SSC yopie / Sporty Sue
A female employee in the SSC Sports club in Yo-kai Watch 2 which allows the player to earn points to adjust their Yo-kai by completing challenges and rebattling bosses.

Janitor

Sophie Thatcet
The rebellious daughter of Mr. Thatcet

Komasaburo
Komasan and Komajiro's adoptive human brother.

List of Yo-kai
Yo-kai are  spiritual beings in the world of Yo-kai Watch, based on various Japanese mythological spirits and figures. They are divided into eight primary tribes: Brave, Mysterious, Tough, Charming, Heartful, Shady, Eerie, and Slippery. The Kaima Tribe is introduced in Yo-kai Watch 2. In Yo-kai Watch 3, a ninth main tribe "Hagure" will debut. Each tribe has its own special song that is played when the Yo-kai is summoned. With some exceptions, Yo-kai are invisible to humans who do not possess the Yo-kai Watch, though they wear put leaiads which disguise themselves as hsehmans. The Yo-kai are listed below based on their numbering in the games' Yo-kai Dictionary (as of Yo-kai Watch Busters: Moon Rabbit Team), while those with fictional character biographies and casting information have made appearances in the television series. Where available, names from the English games, North American English dub, and the North American English manga are on the right while the original Japanese names are on the left.

Brave
 Yo-kai are physically strong and  Yo-kai at heart. Their summoning song goes . Among the Yo-kai in this category are:

Pandle

A Yo-kai who steals the things that people mistakenly leave at home. Pandle can evolve into Undy.

Undy
A skin-tone Yo-kai.

Tanbo
A Yo-kai who is always first to the battle. He is a recolored version of Undy.

Cutta-nah

A lazy droopy sword Yo-kai.

Cutta-nah-nah

A multi-bladed sword Yo-kai who is the evolved form of Cutta-nah.

Slacka-slash

A sword Yo-kai whose blades are shaped like octopus tentacles.

Brushido
A footman Yo-kai who prefers cleaning than war. They and their leader Washogun appeared in episode 50 where they help Nate clean up his house while his parents are away. The Brushidos then end up fighting the Messyrai which were attracted to Jibanyan being messy. Nate led the Brushido into battle against the Messyrai which resulted in Jibanyan being sent flying through the roof.

Washogun
A cleaning shogun Yo-kai who is the evolved form of Katazukerai. He appeared in episode 50 with the Brushidos where they helped Nate clean up his house while his parents are away. He and the Brushidos end up fighting the Messyrai which were attracted to Jibanyan being messy.

Lie-in
A laid-back white lion cub Yo-kai.

Lie-in Heart

A white lion Yo-kai samurai that makes sure that people are prepared for various events. He is the evolved form of Lie-in. Lie-in Heart possesses Bear before the school year starts again, and Nate begs him to help him get ready for the new semester of classes as he forgot to do his homework over summer break.

Hissfit

A cute but angry Yo-kai.

Zerberker
An angry Yo-kai who is the evolved form of Hissfit when fused with a violence sword.

Snartle
A Yo-kai who scares children into behaving well.

Mochismo

A square rice cake Yo-kai that seems mild-mannered. But when he gets, angry his face and muscles burst out from his mochi body.

Minochi

A mochi Yo-kai who gets overprotective of anyone it loves.

Tublappa

A Yo-kai in a bucket that enjoys licking bathtubs.

Slumberhog (Rank D version)
A local sleeping pig Yo-kai who can make people fall asleep by the drop of a hat. Represents Tōhoku.

Snortlehog (Rank B version)
A local pig Yo-kai who is evolved from Nebuta Rank D by fusing it with a Goldfish Paper Lantern. Represents Tōhoku.

Samureel
A local samurai Yo-kai. Represents Chūbu.

Time Keeler
A local samurai Yo-kai who is evolved from Hitsumabushi by fusing it with a Golden Shachihoko. Represents Chūbu.

Slicenrice

A rice ball Yo-kai known for slaying oni, according to the Yo-kai Wiki, although it does not mention that his head is an onigiri and he cooks them. Whisper reveals that he is the only Yo-kai capable of stopping the sweating of Swelton, and this fact makes Swelton happy as he has never had a friend before. However, Slicenrice discovers that Swelton has the perfect kind of saltiness to his sweat to make his onigiri taste better.

Flamurice
A rice Yo-kai who is the evolved form of Slicenrice.

Helmsman

A floating samurai helmet Yo-kai.

Reuknight

A samurai Yo-kai who is the fusion of Helmsman and Armsman.

Corptain
A samurai zombie Yo-kai. He is a recolored version of Reuknight

Mudmunch
A one-eyed mud Yo-kai that when living used to be an old man whose rice field was stolen from him.

 / Sergeant Burly
See recurring character section

Blazion
See recurring character section

Quaken

A lion-like Yo-kai who can make the saddest people cheer up at any time. He is a darker recolored version of Blazion.

Siro
A silver lion-like Yo-kai. He is a palette swap for Blazion and Quaken.

Chansin
A gambling Yo-kai.

Sheen
A Yo-kai swordsman who is evolved from Chansin by fusing him with the Legendary Blade.

Snee
A Yo-kai swordsman who is evolved from Chansin by fusing him with the Cursed Blade.

Gleam
A Yo-kai swordsman who is evolved from Chansin by fusing him with the Holy Blade.

An armored clockwork swordsman Yo-kai who can call one of his 999 weapons from his stomach.

B3-NK1

An ancient clockwork swordsman Yo-kai who destroys modern technology, seeking out the "Hero's Screw" that he believes must be in an appliance so he can reach the next level of his power. He ultimately finds it in Robonyan, who is oddly enjoying being ravaged by Karakuri Benkei's naginata, even after he nearly goes critical. B3-NK1 is a recolored version of Benkei. In the English dub, B3-NK1 merely seeks 1,000 machine screws that are considered "crucial for machine operation."

Moximous N
A shadow Yo-kai that resembles Nathaniel Adams.

Moximous K
A white shadow Yo-kai that resembles Kenny Forester.

 / Hovernyan
 See recurring character section.

Machonyan
An orange cat Yo-kai in a golden tiger mask.

Sushiyama
A Yo-kai that seeks to become Japanese.

Kapunki
A punk Yo-kai in Kabuki makeup. He is a recolored version of Sushiyama.

Beetler
A stag beetle Yo-kai who has a rivalry with Rhinoggin.

Beetall
A stag beetle Yo-kai who is evolved from Beetler by fusing him with the General's Soul.

Cruncha
A stag beetle Yo-Kai. He is a recolored version of Beetall.

Demuncher
A frightening Yo-kai that likes to eat Oni.

Devourer
A frightening life-eating Yo-kai. He is a recolored version of Onigui.

 / Illuminoct
A human-shaped Yo-kai that wears a wispy, pale yellow scarf with the tails resembling dragon heads. He is a recolored version of Venoct.

Mysterious
 Yo-kai are  Yo-kai and use ghostly magic powers. Their summoning song goes . Among the Yo-kai in this category are:

Brokenbrella

A Yo-kai born from a cheap vinyl umbrella that was thrown out after strong winds turned it inside out, and as it watched its owner just go into a convenience store and buy a better one. Brokenbrella turns Keita's umbrella inside out, and then Keita calls on Pallysol to help teach Brokenbrella how to be a better umbrella, both of them managing to survive a rainstorm's strong winds.

Pittapatt
A one-eyed straw sandal Yo-kai.

Snotsolong
A crane Yo-kai with a runny nose.

Duchoo

A duck Yo-kai that people call on if they want to become sick. Nate asks for his help so he can stay home from school to play a video game all day, but his power is actually one to fool other people into thinking the person he possesses is sick by making them feel sick, even though they do not have a fever or any other symptoms to accompany it. He coaches Nate through feigning sick, but Nate's mother is not easily fooled.

D'wanna

A lazy wooden fish-headed monk Yo-kai that makes people want to give up on activities suddenly. He possesses Bear, Eddie, and Katie throughout a school day, and Nate realizes the only way to beat him is with Babblong's power to make people ramble on uncontrollably. The two Yo-kai go back and forth, possessing Katie repeatedly until D'wanna loses the will to keep fighting.

N'more
A wooden fish-headed monk Yo-kai who is evolved from D'wanna.

Q'wit
A wooden fish-headed monk Yo-kai. He is a recolored version of N'more.

Wazzat

A top hat Yo-kai that steals memories and makes people forget things. He used to be a simple hat and was the favorite of his owner. One day, she stopped wearing the hat and forgot she owned it, and now in revenge Wazzat makes people forget things important to them. It is his fault that everyone in Nate's class, including the teacher, forgets to bring something with them. After Nate begins using Wazzat selfishly, he realizes he must stop Wazzat from causing any more trouble. When Nate tries to summon Jibanyan, he accidentally summons Manjimutt whose memories disgust Wazzat. Afterwards, Wazzat gave Nate his medal. In the English dub, Wazzat speaks in the style of Ed Wynn (making him sound like Mr. Scatterbrain in both the US and UK versions of The Mr. Men Show, in which Joey D'Auria also voiced).

Houzzat
A house Yo-kai who is the evolved form of Wazzat.

Dummkap
An orange top hat Yo-kai. He is a recolored version of Wazzat.

Faysoff
A faceless Yo-kai.

Snottle

An oval-headed Yo-kai that makes people stick their fingers in their nose. Keita calls on Jibanyan to help him stop Snottle just as Jibanyan is about to receive a kiss from his favorite member of NyaKB for helping her little sister. Jibanyan took his anger and depression out on both of them.

Lafalotta
A large-mouthed laughter-sucking Yo-kai.

Blips
A large-mouthed Yo-kai. She is a recolored version of Lafalotta.

Tattletell

An old lady Yo-kai that makes people tell their deepest, darkest secrets without their realizing. One possesses Katie and tells everyone she saw Nate use the toilet in school, deeply embarrassing him. After befriending her, Nate has Tattletell help Katie solve a problem at home over her test scores.

Tattlecast
An old lady Yo-kai that carries massive speakers who is the fusion of Lafalotta and Tattletell.

Skranny
An old lady Yo-kai. She is a recolored version of Tattletell.

Cupistol
An egg-shaped Yo-kai.

Casanuva
A Yo-kai who is evolved from Cupistol when fused with the Love Buster.

Casanono
A Yo-Kai. He is a recolored version of Casanuva.

So-sorree

A cotton Yo-kai that makes people do rude things and then give insincere apologies. He inspirited Nate and caused him to do this to his classmates enough to anger him. With help from Blazion, Nate was able to turn the tide against So-sorree.

Bowmninos

A Yo-kai that makes people give overly sincere apologies for almost no reason. He is the evolved form of So-sorree.

Smogling
A smoke Yo-kai.

Smogmella
A smoke Yo-kai who is the evolved form of Koenra.

Signibble

A mischievous Yo-kai that affects electrical energy, causing blackouts and batteries to die. He appears in Nate's house the night he has Eddie and Bear over for a sleepover, affecting their ability to watch a nighttime TV show. Jibanyan's desire to watch the show causes problems and quashes the boy's plans.

Signiton
A Yo-kai who is evolved from Signibble when fused with the GHz Orb.

Statiking
A lazy Yo-kai. He is a recolored version of Signiton.

Master Oden

A Yo-Kai that resembles Signiton in oden shop worker attire.

Failian

An alien-like Yo-kai in a UFO costume that lies about it being an alien from outer space. It causes other people to lie, as well. One possesses Katie, and then goes on a spree about town until Keita manages to trick U.S.O. into admitting that it is only a Yo-kai and not an alien by having Iloo cast an illusion on him.

A white pelican Yo-kai in a cowboy hat and a stars and striped suit. He can make anyone Americanized.

Mirapo
A mirror Yo-kai that can make people warp between two locations and times. One is called by Whisper to take Nate and his family home after their Golden Week trip. Nate later summoned Mirapo in order to take him and Whisper to the Yo-kai World where the Yo-kai Watch Model Zero will go on sale in Yo-kai-lifornia.

Miradox

A triple mirror Yo-kai who is a fusion of Mirap and Espy. In the English dub to Yo-kai Watch: The Movie, Miradox was referred to as Tri-Mirapo.

Mircle
A mirror Yokai. He is a recolored version of Mirapo.

Illoo

An illusion-casting Yo-kai who appears at the Springdale Elementary School on Valentine's Day to trick Eddie and Bear into thinking the girls in their class have given them chocolate. Nate soon discovers the truth and tries to defeat Illoo, but he ends up in one of the illusions himself. Nate later used Illoo in order to fool Failien. Illoo is revealed to have two brothers named Elloo and Alloo.

Elloo
A Yo-kai. He is a recolored version of Illoo and happens to be his brother.

Alloo
A Yo-Kai. He is a reclored version of Illoo and happens to be his brother.

Espy

A three-eyed dog Yo-kai that can read people's minds. One possesses Katie, apparently allowing her to read others' minds until Nate discovers that Espy is behind it. Espy gives up on reading Nate's mind when he starts thinking of inappropriate themes and gives Nate her medal.

Infour
A four-eyed dog Yo-kai who can see a person's age, name, gender, and birthday. She is a recolored version of Espy, but has four eyes.

Verygoodsir

A Yo-kai butler who is brought in by Whisper when he falls ill. While Keita and Jibanyan enjoy Sebastian as he seems superior to Whisper, they soon become overwhelmed by Sebastian's desire for perfection and welcome Whisper back when he is feeling better. Verygoodsir later returned where he was assigned to grade Whisper and Jibanyan on their performances where failure means they spend an eternity as toys where there's a chance that they will be bought by bad boys.

The true Tengu Yo-kai who wields power over wind. Whisper says that he is friends with such a Yo-kai when he discusses Tengus before Nate meets Tengloom. They soon discover he lied about this fact and in fact bothers the real Tengu when they meet him.

Flengu
A Yo-kai that once caused a drought to teach humanity a lesson. He is a recolored version of Tengu.

 See recurring character section.

Frostail
A gray and silver fox Yo-kai. He is a recolored version of Kyubi.

Chymera
A Yo-kai who has the head and arms of a monkey, the hindquarters of a tiger, and a snake-headed tail.

Kingmera
A Yo-Kai with the head and arms of a monkey, the hindquarters of a white tiger, and a snake-headed tail. He is a recolored version of Nue.

Tough
 Yo-kai are tough  Yo-kai who have high defenses. Among the Yo-kai in this category are:

Terrorpotta
An earthenware Yo-kai who can break at any time from his beating heart, so he makes people stand still by making them struck with love. One possesses Nate during field day, making it difficult for him to run around and show Katie how he feels about her.

Dulluma
A daruma Yo-kai.

A gorilla Yo-kai who is the fusion of Dullma and Mochismo.

Goruma
A gorilla Yo-kai. He is a recolored version of Darumacho.

Wotchagot

A rice bowl Yo-kai that haunts a restaurant, making people feel envious of what others eat.

Pride Shrimp

An ebi-fry rice bowl Yo-kai that elevates people's prides, making them stubborn. He is a fusion of Wotchagot and Papa Windbag. Together with Wotchagot, they are collectively known as the  Yo-kai, and live in constant fear of the Eater-types Hungramps and Grubsnitch.

No-Go Kart

An oxcart Yo-kai that makes anyone lost.

Mistank

A tank-like Yo-kai that is the fusion of No-Go Kart and Ledballoon.

Noway

A  Yo-kai that makes people refuse requests. However, his ability can be reversed by asking someone under his spell not to do something. Nate ultimately bests him by using reverse psychology, asking his Yo-kai friends to not do things, and for Noway to not be his friend. During a field day at school, Noway inspirits Katie to not do what Nate says.

Impass
A castle wall Yo-kai who is evolved from Noway. In the "Hanging with Mr. Crabbycat" mini-corner, Impass is depicted to being Noway's father.

Walldin
A castle wall Yo-kai. He is a reclored version of Impass.

Roughraff
See recurring character section.

Badude
An ogre Yo-kai who wields a kanabo. He is evolved from Roughraff.

Bruff
An ogre Yo-kai who wields a kanabo. He is a reclored version of Badude.

Armsman
A headless samurai Yo-kai.

Mimikin

A mannequin Yo-kai that makes people pose weirdly and possesses the ability to appear like others. One possesses Katie, making her say rude things, until Nate manages to get Robonyan to out-perform Mimikin, who just wants to meet someone from NyaKB.

Blowkade
An anthropomorphic porcupinefish Yo-kai.

Ledballoon

An anthropomorphic porcupinefish Yo-kai. He is a recolored version of Blowkade.

A local sumo Yo-kai. Represents Shikoku.

A local sumo Yo-kai. Represents Shikoku.

Whateverest
A local volcano Yo-kai. Represents Kyushu.

Whatuption
A local volcano Yo-kai who is evolved from Assōzan when fused with a Haniwa. Represents Kyushu.

Fidgephant

An elephant Yo-kai that makes people feel the need to urinate. Fidgephant appears in Nate's elementary school, making almost every boy need to go to the bathroom. After Nate is unable to Roughraff, Manjimutt, and Illoo to end Fidgephant's spell, Wazzat steals Fidgephant's memories, allowing Fidgephant to release the water he is holding within himself, and freeing everyone from the urge to urinate.

Touphant
An elephant Yo-kai. He is a recolored version of Fidgephant.

Enduriphant

A mammoth Yo-kai who is the fusion of Fidgephant and Touphant. In the anime, one Fidgephant that was trained by Mr. Batham evolved into Enduriphant after going through hard training.

Zappary
A humanoid Yo-kai.

Frazzel

A humanoid Yo-kai who is evolved from Raizō.

Swelton

An obese horned Yo-kai that makes people sweat a lot. He is sad because he has no friends due to his incessant sweating. However, he befriends Slicenrice as his sweat makes onigiri stick together better. However, Nate, Whisper, and Jibanyan are hesitant to try this onigiri.

Mad Mountain
An icy mountain Yo-kai.

Lava Lord
 A volcano Yo-kai. He is a recolored version of Mad Mountain.

Castelius III
A temple Yo-kai that will make anyone come in third.

Castelius II
A temple Yo-kai that will make anyone come in second. He is the fusion of two Castelius III which he is a recolored version of.

Castelius I

A temple Yo-kai that will make anyone come in first. He is the fusion of two Castelius II which he is a recolored version of.

Castelius Max
A temple Yo-kai that will transcend anyone from winning and losing. He is the evolved form of Castelius I by fusing him with a Platinum Bar.

Rhinoggin
A Hercules beetle Yo-kai who is the rival of Beetler.

Rhinormous
A Hercules beetle Yo-kai who is the evolved form of Rhinoggin by fusing him with an Unbeatable Soul.

Hornaplenty
A Hercules beetle Yo-kai. He is a recolored version of Rhinormus.

 See recurring character section.

Goldenyan
A gold robot cat Yo-kai. He is a recolored version of Robonyan.

A robot cat Yo-kai who is the upgraded version of Robonyan.

Dromp
A large dirt pile Yo-kai who is one of the largest Yo-kai. He can reshape the landscape into a giant maze. Nate and Whisper had to go through one of Dromp's maze which gave them a hard time. With help from Jibanyan and Leadoni, Nate and Whisper made it out of the maze where Dromp gave Nate his medal. However, he put Nate and Whisper in another maze. In episode 119, Dromp was involved in the Yo-kai World's Yo-1 Grand Prix where he placed Nate, Whisper, and Jibanyan in one of his mazes. They got out with the help of Leadoni.

Swosh
A large water Yo-kai who makes anyone he possesses have a wide and forgiving heart as big as the ocean. He is a recolored version of Dromp. Swosh appears in episode 79 where he and Roughraff disrupt at day at the beach for Nate, Eddie, and Bear.

Toadal Dude
A humanoid Yo-kai that used to be a toad.

Uber Geeko
A humanoid Yo-kai that used to be a giant gecko. He is a recolored version of Toadal Dude who happens to be his cousin.

Gargaros

A giant red Oni Yo-kai with one horn that wields a kanabo. He is one of the onis who inhabit the Oni Time dimension who chase children who leave the house without their parents' permission. Nate, Whisper, and Jibanyan are chased when he goes out to buy cream buns when his mother asked him to stay home to wait for the deliveryman. In a later episode, Gargaros chased Nate, Whisper, and Jibanyan again. This time, Gargaros leaves upon getting annoyed by Nate's strategical discussion.

Ogralus
A giant blue Oni Yo-kai with two horns that wields a kanabo. He is one of the onis who inhabit the Oni Time dimension who chase children who leave the house without their parents' permission.

Orcanos
A giant black Oni Yo-kai with two horns that wields a kanabo. He is one of the onis who inhabit the Oni Time dimension who chase children who leave the house without their parents' permission.

Charming
 Yo-kai are cute and cuddly Yo-kai who are fast fighters. Their summoning song is  Among the Yo-kai in this category are:

Leggly

A messenger Yo-kai that resembles a kasa with visible legs.

Dazzabel

A skeleton Yo-kai that makes people dress extravagantly. She takes control of Nate's mother on the day of the classroom visit, making her dress in extremely gaudy outfits, and even makes Hungramps and Whisper more fashionable. The only way to end her control is by having the Yo-kai Dimmy negate her effects. After her bow and umbrella are lost and her bright colors become subdued, she gives up her Yo-kai Medal.

Rattelle
A skeletal ghost Yo-kai who is the fusion of Dazzabel and Cupistol.

Skelebella
A skeletal ghost Yo-kai. She is a recolored version of Rattelle.

Cadin

A cicada Yo-kai that is formed when a cicada dies after its one week of life. Nate accidentally wakes one up when he is out treasure hunting.

Cadable
A cicada Yo-kai that is evolved from Cadin.

Singcada
A cicada Yo-kai. He is a recolored version of Cadable.

Pupsicle

An ice dog Yo-kai who can make anyone freeze even in the summer.

Chilhuahua
An ice chihuahua who is the evolved form of Pupsicle when fused with the Snowstorm Cloak.

Swelterrier

A fiery chihuahua Yo-kai who is the leader of the  Yo-kai composed of Blazion, Sproink, Swelton, and himself where they spread sweltering heat everywhere they hang out. Their latest spot is where Nate was attending a party. However, they are constantly ruined by Blizzaria who stubbornly wishes to hang out with them, bringing an even powerful freezing blizzard that they cannot stand. Nate gets Swelterrier's medal that is encased in ice. Swelterrier is a recolored version of Chilhuahua.

Jumbelina
 A humanoid Yo-kai with a mixed-up face and has the ability to swap people's faces.

Boyclops

A traditional cyclops Yo-kai that Keita discovers in an old house in town with Rokurokubi and Karakasa-obake. Whisper helps the classic Yo-kai in gaining back their ability to scare modern youth. After they are nearly exorcised, Keita manages to get the Yo-kai Watch Model Zero to work and brings them back.

See main character section.

A cat Yo-kai that resembles Jibanyan, but is surrounded by a reddish fire energy.

An orange cat Yo-kai. He is a recolored version of Jibanyan.

A light brown cat Yo-kai with kiwifruit skin on parts of its body. Kiwinyan appears as one of Mr. Crabbycat's associates at the Yo-kai school. He is a recolored version of Jibanyan.

Grapenyan
A dark purple grape-themed cat Yo-kai. He is a recolored version of Jibanyan.

Strawbnyan
A strawberry-themed cat Yo-kai. He is a recolored version of Jibanyan.

Watermelnyan

A watermelon-themed cat Yo-kai. Watermelnyan appears as one of Mr. Crabbycat's superiors at the Yo-kai school. He is a recolored version of Jibanyan.

A melon-themed cat Yo-kai. He is a recolored version of Jibanyan.

A sapphire cat Yo-kai who is a sapphire version of Jibanyan and is a member of the Jewel-nyans.

Emenyan
An emerald cat Yo-kai who is an emerald version of Jibanyan and is a member of the Jewel-nyans.

Rubinyan
A ruby cat Yo-kai who is a ruby version of Jibanyan and is a member of the Jewel-nyans.

A topaz cat Yo-kai who is a ruby version of Jibanyan and is a member of the Jewel-nyans.

A diamond cat Yo-kai who is a diamond version of Jibanyan and is a member of the Jewel-nyans. He appeared in episode 40 where he was listed as the number one of the Top 10 Popular Yo-kai.

Thornyan

A cat Yo-kai who is a fusion of Jibanyan and Coughkoff. Thornyan appears in the anime when Jibanyan catches a cold. Thornyan is able to shoot spikes from his body when he sneezes, and soon infects Hidabat and Blazion with a cold that also makes them shoot off spikes.

Baddinyan

A cat Yo-kai who is the fusion of Jibanyan and Roughraff. Under the influence of Roughraff in the anime, Jibanyan transforms into the bōsōzoku-inspired Baddinyan who thinks he is doing bad things but is not that effective in scaring Nate.

A white and red cat Yo-kai. In Yo-kai Watch 2, Buchinyan is created when Jibanyan and Whisper are fused together into a single Yo-kai.

A cat Yo-kai that is dressed as a sailor fuku.

A special cat Yo-kai who is a pirate that can be obtained from a download code in the game Wonder Flick.

A cat Yo-kai that resembles Jibanyan in a jet hat.

Panja Pupil
A local giant panda Yo-kai. Represents Kantō.

Panja Pro
A local giant panda Yo-kai who is evolved from Panja Pupil by fusing it with an Artisan Paper Lantern. Represents Kantō.

Walkappa

A  Yo-kai that lives in Springdale's river. He is a standard kappa, a fact that plays into his favor when Nate tries to win over the friendship of Tattletell, as none of his secrets are truly traumatic secrets.

Appak
A kappa Yo-kai who is evolved from Walkappa.

Supyo
A kappa Yo-kai. He is a recolored version of Appak.

A robot kappa Yo-kai who is a robot version of Walkappa.

See recurring character section.

Komane
A lion dog Yo-kai who is evolved from Komasan.

A lion dog Yo-kai that resembles Komasan, but is surrounded by a blue flame-like aura.

See recurring character section.

Komiger
A lion dog Yo-kai that is evolved from Komanjiro. He is a recolored version of Komane.

A lion dog Yo-kai that resembles Komajiro, but is surrounded by a golden-orange aura.

A robot lion dog Yo-kai that resembles a robot version of Komasan.

A lion dog Yo-kai that is the fusion of Komasan and Komajiro.

A purple and pink tapir Yo-kai that makes people fall asleep and then it eats their dreams. She says she wants to eat the perfect dream and then she will be done, and she will know which one it is by how tall the dreamer appears in the dream. After failing to find one among Nate's classmates, Nate calls on Shogunyan who has just the dream Baku is looking for.

A purple tapir Yo-kai that is evolved from Baku.

Whapir
A white tapir Yo-kai. She is a recolored version of Baku.

Drizzelda

A ghostly white girl Yo-kai with an umbrella on her head. She has the ability to make it rain where she is no matter what the forecast is.

Nekidspeed
A muscular Yo-kai that has a shoe head who makes people run constantly. He first appeared in episode 37 during a field day where he inspirited Aaron Adams into racing against Nate and the other racers enough for him to win much to the disappointment of Nate and to the confusion of everyone that attended.

Shmoopie

A small Shiba Inu Yo-kai that makes people forgive someone who seems to act all dizzy and forgetful with pure charm. One possesses Katie and causes problems in class when she does things that should get her in trouble, but all of the boys and their teacher forgive her. Nate manages to subdue him when he calls on Manjimutt who wants Shmoopie's ability to help him, but it proves unsuccessful.

Pinkipoo
A Shiba Inu Yo-kai with heart-shaped ears who is evolved from Shmoopie.

Pookivil
A Shiba Inu Yo-Kai with heart-shaped ears. It is a recolored version of Pinkipoo and is an embodiment of her bad side.

Harry Barry
A bear Yo-kai.

Frostina

A pale-skinned humanoid Yo-kai that has power over ice and snow.

Blizzaria

See recurring character section.

Damona
A pale-skinned humanoid Yo-kai who has power over ice and darkness. She is a recolored version of Blizzaria.

Faux Kappa

The real mythical kappa who Nate seeks out when he discovers Walkappa will not be able to help him on a report on yōkai.

A blue kappa with stripes. He is a recolored version of Faux Kappa.

A bronze cat Yo-kai. Master Nyada is a master of a mystical power known as the "Hose".

Heartful
 Yo-kai are a group of warm and inviting Yo-kai who excel at healing. Among the Yo-kai in this category are:

Wantston

A boy Yo-kai who makes anyone he inspirits be envious of what other people have. One Wantston inspirited Nate to want things. With help from Whisper and Jibanyan, Nate was able to summon Komasan to help fight him where Komajiro also came along for the ride. Komasan annoyed Wantson much to the dismay of Nate and Komajiro. Wantson ran off while leaving Nate his medal.

Grubsnitch

A by Yo-kai that makes people sneak snacks from larger prepared meals, and will not stop until the whole meal is devoured. One possesses Nate's mother when she prepares dinner for the family but begins eating it before anyone else has a chance. He is defeated when Nate has Hungramps make his mother actually hungry instead of desiring the snacks from the meal. He is a recolored version of Wantson.

Wiglin

A seaweed Yo-kai that makes people dance well. He is friends with Steppa and Rhyth.

A seaweed Yo-kai who is the evolved form of Wiglin.

Steppa

A seaweed Yo-kai that makes people dance well. He is friends with Wiglin and Rhyth

Rhyth

A seaweed Yo-kai who, alongside her friends Wiglin and Steppa, loves to dance. They possess Nate when he is worried about being shown up in a dance lesson in gym class. He thanks them, unaware that they will make him dance uncontrollably in all of the subsequent touch choices he has to make throughout the rest of the day.

Hungramps

An old man Yo-kai that makes people feel hungry all the time. He was once a human who many years ago brought his granddaughter to a convenience store and bought her a little toy charm. However, as his granddaughter grew up, she began to see him less and less. When he died, Hungramps began haunting the convenience store. Nate and Whisper convince him that rather than haunt the store, he should try to find his granddaughter. Just as he leaves, his granddaughter, now a high school student, walks by reminiscing on how her late grandfather bought her a toy from the store and she still has it as a little strap on her book bag, making Hungramps happy again. Later on in the series, he is constantly featured with Grubsnitch as the  Yo-kai duo, appearing not too far from any food-like Yo-kai to strike their fear of being consumed as a running gag.

Hungorge
A gluttonous Yo-kai who is evolved from Hungramps.

Grainpa
An old man Yo-kai with a body made of rice. He is a recolored version of Hungramps.

A robot Yo-kai who is the robotic version of Hungramps.

Tongus
A mushroom girl Yo-kai whose tongue can heal any wounds.

Nurse Tongus
A nurse Yo-kai who is the fusion of Tongus and Shmoopie.

Sandmeh

A simple and easy going humanoid sand Yo-kai who makes people be honest and laid back. One possesses Eddie on his birthday, nearly ruining the day as Sandmeh made him tell his parents he did not want a big party. With help from Komasan, Nate was able to get Sandmeh to have Eddie open up.

Mister Sandmeh
A humanoid sand Yo-kai with an office worker motif. He is evolved from Sandmeh when fused with the Sand Suit.

Pallysol

A traditional umbrella tsukumogami Yo-kai that Keita discovers in an old house in town with Hitotsume-kozō and Rokurokubi. Whisper helps the classic Yo-kai in gaining back their ability to scare modern youth. After they are nearly exorcised, Keita manages to get the Yo-kai Watch Model Zero to work and brings them back.

Scarasol
A demonic Yo-kai who is the fusion of Pallysol and Mad Mountain. When its umbrella is open, it has good defense. When its umbrella is closed, it has good offense.

Happycane
A local plant Yo-kai. Represents Okinawa.

Starrycane
A local plant Yo-kai. Represents Okinawa.

Lodo
A blue-skinned boy Yo-kai who can make people lose their money.

Supoor Hero

A masked blue-skinned boy Yo-kai that makes people lose their money, making them poor. Supoor Hero is evolved from Lodo. One affects Nate when he goes out to buy a new manga as he plans on "protecting" the city from money. When Nate summoned Manjimutt, Supoor Hero's powers don't work because Manjimutt was already at the maximum level of patheticness. He is thwarted when a group of Nokos appears turning his powers into giving people good luck in getting expensive things. Before turning into a Noko, Supoor Hero gave Nate his medal.

Chippa
A pink-skinned boy Yo-kai who makes people not worry about things. He is a recolored version of Lodo.

Gnomey
A mischievous child Yo-kai who brings joy to anyone that lives in the house that it occupies.

High Gnomey
A Yo-kai who is the self-proclaimed God of the Gnomey Community. He is evolved from Gnomey.

Enerfly

A butterfly Yo-kai that makes things around people perfect. One possesses Eddie and gives him great luck at several things until Nate summons Buhu to scare it away.

Enefly

A butterfly Yo-kai that ends friendships. One possesses Nate when he believes it's the other Enerfly and he nearly loses his friendship with Katie, Bear, and Eddie in the process. He is a recolored version of Enerfly.

Betterfly
A butterfly Yo-kai who is the fusion of Enerfly and Enefly.

Peppillon
A butterfly Yo-kai that makes people feel mundane activities are exciting and fun. It possesses Nate's parents during their Golden Week plans to see a nearby waterfall. Even though Nate feels he should get rid of the Yo-kai, Whisper convinces him to let his parents enjoy the holiday. When it started to rain, Peppillon left. Peppillon is a recolored version of Betterfly.

Predictabull
A half-man half-ox Yo-kai that can see into the future.

Smashibull
A half-man half-ox Yo-kai that is evolved from Kudan when fused with a Supernatural Powers Water.

Don Chan
A mint-blue drum Yok-kai who is the mascot of Taiko no Tatsujin. He was included in Yo-kai Watch 2 as a collaboration between Level-5 and Namco.

Ray O'Light

A sun-headed Yo-kai who brings fine weather wherever he goes.

Happierre

Happierre is a gaseous Yo-kai who makes people happy and carefree. His presence negates the abilities of his wife Dismarelda.

Reversa
A mixed feelings gaseous Yo-kai who is the fusion of Happierre and Dismarelda.

Reversette
A gaseous Yo-kai. She is the recolored version of Reversa.

Ol' Saint Trick

An elderly Yo-kai who has three bags that he gives gifts from. However, one must guess which one of the three has a present while the other two contains punishments. He is often confused for Santa Claus.

Ol' Fortune
An elderly Yo-kai. He is a recolored version of Ol' Saint Trick. Unlike Ol' Saint Trick, Ol' Fortune his bags contain presents.

Rollen
A disembodied head Yo-kai with dice for eyes. Everything that Rollen does is decided on the roll of his dice eyes with the outcome changing his personality.

Dubbles
A disembodied head Yo-kai with dice for eyes. He is a recolored version of Rollen. Dubbles can inspirit anyone and point them to an unknown fate.

Papa Bolt
A humanoid Yo-kai that rides on a cloud. He is the husband of Mama Aura.

Uncle Infinite
A humanoid Yo-kai that rides on a cloud. He is a recolored version of Papa Bolt who is even scared at Uncle Infinite's powers.

Mama Aura
A humanoid female Yo-kai that rides on a cloud. She is the wife of Papa Bolt where she can calm any dispute or storm.

Auntie Heart
A humanoid female Yo-kai that rides on a cloud. She is a recolored version of Mama Aura.

Kyryn

A sacred Yo-kai that guards lives.

Unikirin

A holy Yo-kai. He is a recolored version of Qilin.

Shady
 Yo-kai are hazy and shadowy Yo-kai who always have mean thoughts, and can bring down the stats of their opponents. Among the Yo-kai in this category are:

Leadoni
A one-eyed, one-horned Oni Yo-kai with a long right arm who has the ability to lead anyone. Leadoni helped Nate and Whisper twice when they ended up in Dromp's mazes.

Mynimo
A one-eyed one-horned Oni Yo-kai with a long right arm in which anyone he plants his flag on gets better treatment than the people around them. He is a recolored version of Leadoni.

Ake

A round-headed bratty Yo-kai who can make anyone's shoulders achy.

Payn

A round-headed Yo-kai who make people's shoulders stiff and achy and is evolved from Ake when fused with a Buff Weight. Two Payns have gone around Springdale affecting Nate's father and friends. When Nate asks to have the same sensation, his pliable shoulders prove a challenge for the master and apprentice.
 
Agon
A round-headed Yo-kai that gives people a slipped disc in their back. He is a recolored version of Payn.

TETSUYA (from ) / Wydeawake

A pale-skinned Yo-kai that lies on a cloud. He can make anyone play video games to the point where they can play them all night.

KANTETSU (from ) / Allnyta
A Yo-kai who is the fusion of Wydeawake and Hidabat. In Yo=-kai Watch 3, Allnyta is a fusion of Wydeawake and Tengloom.

Herbiboy
A mysterious-looking humanoid Yo-kai.

Carniboy
A humanoid Yo-kai that is the fusion of Herbiboy and Blazion.

Negatibuzz

A mosquito-like Yo-kai that makes people depressed, affecting his dentist when Nate goes in about a sore tooth. The dentist becomes so depressed and Nate is in so much pain, that he finally calls on Blazion to counteract Negatibuzz's control. This makes the dentist too eager.

Moskevil
A mosquito Yo-kai who is evolved from Negatibuzz.

Scritchy
A mosquito Yo-kai that makes anyone she sucks blood from itch. She is a recolored version of Moskevil.

Dimmy

A shadow ninja-like Yo-kai. Dimmy that lives in the shadows and makes people and things more simple and subdued, in appearance and personality. He affects Jibanyan on the day of the classroom visit and when his presence is what is needed to stop Dazzabel, Keita realizes that Jibanyan was under his control. Dimmy, however, does not want anything to do with what is happening, rather wanting to be subdued. Whisper forcibly pushes him into Dazzabel to solve everyone's problems and he gives Nate his Yo-kai Medal for the future.

Blandon
A purple scroll Yo-kai who is evolved from Dimmy.

Nul
A scroll Yo-kai. He is a recolored version of Blandon.

Suspicioni

An Oni Yo-kai that has three eyes where two are on top of each other and one is behind its head. He can make anyone feel suspicious.

Tantroni
An Oni Yo-kai that has three eyes where two are on top of each other and one is behind its head. He is a recolored version of Suspicioni and can throw fits.

Contrarioni
An Oni Yo-kai that has three eyes where two are on top of each other and one is behind its head. He is a recolored version of Suspicioni and can make anyone disagree with anything.

Grampus Khan
A local sheep Yo-kai. Represents Hokkaido.

Groupus Khan
A local sheep Yo-kai who is evolved from Grampus Khan when fused with a Bear Wooden Carving. Represents Hokkaido. Groupus Khan commands the Grampus Khan army.

Hidabat
See recurring character section.

Abodabat
A bat Yo-kai dressed in a small biege house. It is a fusion of Hidabat and Tengloom. In Yo-kai Watch 3, Abodabat is evolved from Hidabat when fused with a Comfortable Closet.

Belfree
A bat Yo-kai dressed in a small house. It is a recolored version of Abodabat.

Yoink

A Yo-kai that makes people give up their belongings to others. One possesses Bear and Nate discovers that the Yo-kai has made his belongings disappear. Nate tries to get Yoink's help at home, but only causes more trouble. This lasted until he has Yoink possess his father and ask his mother for a motorcycle only to be extremely rebuffed.

Gimme

A backpack-headed Yo-kai who makes anyone borrow anything and makes them keep that item. He is evolved from Yoink. Gimme was stealing things from Nate's room and did various moves to do it. When Count Zapaway was summoned, he challenged Gimme to find the remote control. When Gimme gives up on the hardest level, he gives back Nate's stuff and gives him his medal. Afterwards, Gimme helps Nate, Whisper, and Jibanyan look for the remote control where they are unaware that it's in the refrigerator.

K'mon-K'mon

An impatient humanoid Yo-kai who Nate and Whisper meet when traveling into the Yo-kai World to get the new Yo-kai Watch Model Zero that was on sale in Yo-kai-lifornia. He becomes impatient when the line does not move and causes a commotion. This causes Nate to summon Jibanyan who ends up fighting K'mon-K'mon.

Yoodooit

An elderly Yo-kai on a red flying pillow that makes people give up tasks so long as others are available to take over for them. One possesses Lily Adams while she is doing household chores, leaving Nate to take care of everything himself.

Count Zapaway

A remote control Yo-kai in a vampire cape that hides remote controls. One appears in Nate's house just as he and Jibanyan are planning to watch a sports event. They went through each level until Aaron Adams told them the old-fashioned way of turning on the television. Upon being defeated by that move, Count Zapaway surrendered the remote and left his Yo-kai Medal. He was later summoned by Nate to deal with Gimme where Count Zapaway puts Gimme through each level to find the remote. When on the hardest level, Gimme surrenders. Afterwards, Count Zapaway has Nate, Whisper, Jibanyan, and Gimme continue looking for the remote unaware that Count Zapaway had it in the refrigerator. In the English dub, Count Zapaway speaks in the style of Bela Lugosi.

Tyrat
A crown-wearing mouse Yo-kai

Tengloom

A crow-like Yo-kai in geta sandals who makes people dour and gloomy with his feather fan.

Nird
A crow-like Yo-kai in geta sandals. He is a recolored version of Tengloom.

Snobetty
An unreasonable Yo-kai.

Slimamander

A three-headed reptilian Yo-kai with eyelash appendages on its mouths. The middle head has an eye in its mouth.

Dracunyan

A blue cat Yo-kai in vampire attire who takes over Springdale on Halloween, turning everyone but Nate and his friends into Dracunyan minions. After his friends are turned into Dracunyan one after the other, Nate attempts to use Eddie's idea to cure everyone, but it only transforms everyone into Manjimutt instead. Just as Nate is going crazy, he wakes up from what was apparently a nightmare that he and Whisper shared, with Jibanyan nearby dressed as a vampire.

See main characters section.

Usapyon 
A form of Usapyon when his element changes to fire.

Usapyon 
A form of Usapyon when his element changes to water.

Usapyon 
A form of Usapyon when his element changes to earth.

Usapyon 
A form of Usapyon when his element changes to lightning.

Negasus
A short Pegasus Yo-kai who can make anyone do things that would get them into trouble.

Neighfarious
A short Pegasus Yo-kai. He is a recolored version of Negasus.

Timidevil
A devil Yo-kai who can make anyone timid and afraid of everything.

Beelzebold
A devil Yo-kai who is evolved from Timidevil by fusing with the Shard of Evil.

Count Cavity
A devil Yo-kai who causes his targets to develop cavities. He is a recolored version of Beelzebold.

Eyesoar
A multi-eyed Oni Yo-kai.

A multi-eyed Oni Yo-kai. It is a recolored version of Eyesoar.

Greesel
An elderly humanoid Yo-kai on a floating purple zabuton who seeks to control the world's wealth.

Awevil
An elderly aristocratic humanoid Yo-kai on a floating purple zabuton. He is a recolored version of Greesel.

Wobblewok
A Yo-kai that looks like a black round mass inside a giant rice cooker.

Darkyubi
A silver fox Yo-kai. He is a recolored version of Kyubi. This is a version of Kyubi that has been lured to the dark side.

Eerie
 Yo-kai are spooky Yo-kai that often induce status conditions. Among the Yo-kai in this category are:

Coughkoff

A sea urchin Yo-kai with an eye in the opened section of it that makes people have coughing fits. He appears in Nate's house to make Nate cough when Duchoo fails to trick Nate's mother.

Hurchin
A sea urchin Yo-kai with an eye in the opened section of it that gives people headaches. He is a recolored version of Coughkoff even though he hates him.

Droplette
A water drop Yo-kai that makes anywhere that it lives damp and moldy.

Drizzle

A watery Yo-kai that causes inclement weather to bring people's vacations to a halt. It manages to create a rainstorm that stops Peppillon's control over Nate and his family, but Nate calls on Robonyan to stop the rain from ruining Golden Week.

Slush
A ghostly Yo-kai that can freeze anything.

Alhail
A large melty Yo-kai with strong ice powers that is evolved from Slush. He is a recolored version of Drizzle.

Gush
A Yo-kai that causes nosebleeds. He is a recolored version of Slush. In the anime, Gush can make things drip.

Peckpocket

A plump bird Yo-kai that makes people steal things from others. One possesses Bear until Nate realizes something is wrong with his behavior.

Robbinyu
A plump bird Yo-kai who is evolved from Peckpocket.

Rockabelly

A plump bird Yo-kai that makes people do an embarrassing dance, showing off their stomach that has a face on it similar to one on Rockabelly. He is a recolored version of Peckpocket.

Squeeky
A small humanoid Yo-kai.

Rawry

A humanoid Yo-kai who is evolved from Squeeky when fused with a Booming Horn. There is loud sounds everywhere he goes.

Buhu

A downcast-looking bird-like Yo-kai that makes people depressed by manipulating events around them. She follows around Nate after she becomes depressed because she missed a handsome bird. She unintentionally causes distress to Bear, leading Nate to call on Robonyan to restore Bear's good spirits.

Flumpy
A downcast-looking bird-like Yo-kai that makes people unfashionable and awkward. He is a recolored version of Buhu.

Skreek
A downcast-looking bird-like Yo-kai that makes people feel despair.

Manjimutt
See recurring character section.

Multimutt
A two-headed guard dog Yo-kai who is the fusion of two Manjimutts. He has two angry heads on snake-like necks. In Yo-kai Watch 2, Multimutt is evolved from Manjimutt.

Sir Berus
An elite two-headed guard dog Yo-kai that was born and raised in the Netherworld. He is a recolored and altered version of Multimutt.

Robomutt
A robot dog Yo-kai who is a mechanical version of Manjimutt.

Furgus
A furry Yo-kai with a furry snake-like tail instead of legs. Anyone it inspirits causes their hair to grow. While other Yo-kai enjoy this, some humans don't.

Furdinand

A black wig Yo-kai who is evolved from Furgus. He can make hair change in shape and thickness which can be cancelled out by rain. In the English dub, Furdinand speaks in the style of Bill Thompson's character Wallace Wimple from Fibber McGee and Molly.

Nosirs 

A group of big-nosed Yo-kai who disrupt Nate's class while they are having an exam, making them doubt themselves. The Nosirs appear to be malicious, but they only want to help people. When they point out that Nate has inserted a Yo-kai Medal into his Yo-kai Watch incorrectly, he thanks them and it causes a massive change in heart in the trio. One holds out his hand in gratitude, but he is drawn into the Yo-kai Watch forever to remind Nate if he puts a Medal in backwards and the other two pass on to the other side.

Dismarelda

Dismarelda is a large purple blob Yo-kai whose presence causes people to fight. If near married couples, she could even cause a divorce. She meets Nate when she leaves her house after a fight with her husband Happierre and causes Nate's parents to fight. She and Happierre make up later.

Chatalie

A big-mouthed humanoid Yo-kai who makes people tell white lies, like politicians. She possesses Bear, making him lie about an upcoming test and that he can break a world record on the track, making him unliked by his classmates. She then "helps" Eddie win the class president election by making him lie about his plans for being in office, ultimately helping him, only encouraging her to make him claim he will take over the world next.

Nagatha
A big-mouthed humanoid Yo-kai that makes anyone nag. She is a recolored version of Chatalie.

Danke Sand
A local sand-pile Yo-kai. Represents Chūgoku.

No Sankyu
A local sand-pile Yo-kai who is evolved from Danke Sand by fusing it with a Dune Sand. Represents Chūgoku.

Papa Windbag

A short old man Yo-kai that makes people boast. He affected both the Classic Yo-kai trio that Nate has befriended and his classmates.

Ben Tover
An elongated humanoid Yo-kai.

Cheeksqueek

A Yo-kai that makes people commit flatulence uncontrollably. Nate discovers one in his classroom and is attacked by its abilities after Katie is affected. Nate realizes the only way to defeat him is to use a Yo-kai that cannot pas gas calling on Robonyan who does not fart but has an air freshener within him.

Cuttincheez
A Yo-kai that can manipulate the smells of anything that stinks. He is a recolored version of Cheeksqueek.

Toiletta

The "Hanako-san of the Toilet" of every school's myths in Friday the 13th and Tuesday the 13th, this humanoid female Yo-kai hit a writer's block after realizing how she doesn't scare children anymore and is being treated as more of a school attraction. After being advised by Nate to widen her grounds, she starts spooking kids and people outside of toilets, even making her way to people's homes through cursed DVDs, regaining her confidence. She eventually becomes a Yo-kai Producer, helping to promote Yo-kai that want to become famous as their agent.

Foiletta
A humanoid female Yo-kai that is evolved from Hanako-san when fused with a Cursed Journal in Friday the 13th.

Sproink

A large and powerful pig-like Yo-kai who lives in an onsen. He makes the bathwaters boiling hot to where no human can enjoy the bath. Nate encountered Sproink at a public onsen where none of the Yo-kai he summoned can handle the hot water. However, he is defeated when Mr. Batham turns the hot water on too high as the current water temperature was not warm enough for him.

Compunzer
An odd humanoid-shaped Yo-kai on a cushion whose jokes fall flat.

Lamedian
An odd humanoid-shaped Yo-kai on a cushion who tells bad jokes.

Grumples
A wrinkly elderly woman Yo-kai that can fire beams from her staff that shrivel up anything. Her effects can be countered when the affected human or item is washed.

Everfore
A young woman Yo-kai who is evolved from Grumples upon fusing her with Ageless Powder. She can absorb the youth of anyone to sustain her youth.

Eterna
A young woman Yo-kai. She is a recolored version of Everfore.

A black cat Yo-kai that is a Batman parody of Jibanyan. His abilities allow him to avoid Soultimate attacks.

Insomni

A one-eyed jinn Yo-kai who makes people stay awake because she feels that it is fun to make people not go to sleep, even though they will all get sick without sleep. Nate calls on Baku to fight her to keep her from inducing insomnia in his whole class, and while it appears she has the upper hand, this is all within a dream Baku made her have.

Sandi
A one-eyed jinn Yo-kai who pulls people into their dreams so that she can play with them. She is a recolored version of Insomni.

Arachnus
A humanoid Yo-kai that can turn into his true spider form.

Arachnia
A humanoid Yo-kai that can turn into his true spider form. He is a recolored version of Arachnus.

Slippery
 Yo-kai are wiggly Yo-kai who are hard to target and buff their allies' stats. Among the Yo-kai in this category are:

Cricky

A frog Yo-kai who gives people cricked necks. He was once the pet of an old chiropractor. When people stopped showing up due to a spa that opened up down the street, Cricky went to look for customers until he passed away in a bicycle accident, became a Yo-kai, and became more interested in other things. When having inspirited Bear and Eddie, Nate summoned Jibanyan where Cricky surrendered before Jibanyan could attack. When Nate brings him to the chiropractic center again, he sees his owner still hard at work with customers since the other place only had massage chairs. Cricky begins to watch over her again bringing in more customers for her using his ability.

Noko

A snake-like Yo-kai who is supposed to be very rare and as such brings good luck to those who find him. Whisper talked to Nate about them where Whisper failed to notice the Noko appearing behind his back. One Noko gave Nate his Yo-kai Medal. The Noko later helped Nate where they revered Supoor Hero's ability.

Bloominoko
A snake-like Yo-kai who is evolved from Noko upon fusing it with the Drop of Joy.

Pandanoko

A panda-colored snake-like Yo-kai. Noko who has trouble deciding whether he should be a panda or a Noko. He eventually catches the interest of Next Harmeowny who form a collaboration with him and take him on tour where he develops a cocky celebrity personality.

A robotic snake Yo-kai who is a mechanized version of Noko.

Snaggly
A pear-shaped furry Yo-kai. Anyone inspirited by Snaggly trips a lot.

Whinona
A pear-shaped furry Yo-kai who is evolved from Snaggly.

See main characters section.
Whispocrates
A ghost Yo-kai who is a past version of Whisper and also went by the name Nonuttin.

Heheheel

An eel in a jar Yo-kai that makes people laugh uncontrollably. One possesses Eddie while he and Nate visit Bear who is in the hospital for a broken arm. Nate tries to use Dismarelda to stop him, but calls on Jibanyan instead and they eventually get Heheheel to stop by giving him some dried squid.

Croonger
An eel in a jar Yo-kai. It is a recolored version of Heheheel.

Urnaconda
An eel in a jar Yo-kai. It is a recolored version of Heheheel.

Fishpicable
A fish-like Yo-kai that sees the badness in people and slaps them with its tail.

Rageon
A fish-like Yo-kai with a knife wrapped around its tail. It is evolved from Fishpicable.

Tunatic
A fish-like Yo-kai with a knife wrapped around its tail. It is a recolored version of Rageon.

Takoyakid
A local takoyaki Yo-kai. Represents Kinki.

Takoyaking
A local takoyaki Yo-kai with octopus tentacles for limbs. It is the evolved form of Takoyakid when fused with a Takoyaki Pan. Represents Kinki.

Flushback

An elderly turtle Yo-kai who was traumatized from an incident where he was almost flushed down the toilet only to be saved by his owner, a little girl, using a plunger. As such, he makes people he inspirits remember their past traumas, affecting Nate when he tries to do his class duties to impress Katie. In a bid to "forget" his past trauma, he summons Dummkap who manages to make Flushback forget his own past trauma, but unfortunately made both of them embarrassing idiots as a result.

Vacuumory
An elderly turtle Yo-kai who is evolved from Flushback when fused with the Memory Vacuuming Machine.

Irewig
A centipede Yo-kai who can make anyone ticked off at anything.

Firewig
A centipede Yo-kai who is evolved from Muramukade.

Draggie
A small dragon Yo-kai who uses the ball on its head to see the hidden strengths in anyone.

Dragon Lord
A Japanese dragon Yo-kai.

Azure Dragon
A Japanese dragon Yo-kai. It is a recolored version of Dragon Lord.

Robo-Draggie
A small red robotic dragon Yo-kai who is the mechanized version of Draggie.

Mermaidyn

A mermaid Yo-kai that Nate constantly hooks one by accident whenever he goes fishing no matter how small the body of water. Mistaking it as his desire to call her, she gives him her Medal out of frustration. Despite this, he still calls her out by fishing instead of using the Yo-kai Watch.

Mermadonna
A mermaid Yo-kai who is evolved from Ningyo by fusing her with the Mermaid's Jewel. If one loves the Mermadonna, there's a chance that they will get immortality.

Mermother
A mermaid Yo-kai. She is a recolored version of Mermadonna.

Lady Longnek

A traditional long-necked woman Yo-kai that Nate discovers in an old house in town with Boyclops and Pallysol. Whisper helps the classic Yo-kai in gaining back their ability to scare modern youth. After they are nearly exorcised, Nate manages to get the Yo-kai Watch Model Zero to work and brings them back.

Daiz

A pink ghost Yo-kai who makes anyone space off. It dislikes being compared to a sausage by anyone

Confuze
A blue ghost Yo-kai that makes anyone confused. It is a recolored version of Daiz.

Chummer
An anthropomorphic shark Yo-kai who can make people loiter so that he can eat them.

Shrook
An anthropomorphic turquoise shark Yo-kai who can make anyone lose their mastery over what they are good at. He is a recolored version of Chummer.

Spenp

A one-eyed green clam-like Yo-kai with a zipper on its mouth that was formed during the Japanese asset price bubble. He makes people waste money on things so they become happy.

Almi
A red one-eyed clam-like Yo-kai with a zipper on its mouth who makes anyone treat others until they get an empty wallet. He is a recolored version of Spenp.

Babblong

A Yo-kai with a very long nose that makes people speak in the Osaka dialect and tell long-winded and annoying stories. In the English dub, Babblong speaks in the style of Jimmy Durante.

Bananose
A Yo-kai with a very long nose who is made of bananas. He is a partially-recolored version of Babblong.

Draaagin
A Japanese dragon Yo-kai.

SV Snaggerjag
An anglerfish Yo-kai in a boat that commands all the fish that live in his lake.

Copperled
A red snake Yo-kai who can make anyone take charge of anything. He appeared in episode 60 where he made Eddie take charge of things. When Nate, Whisper, and Jibanyan chase after Copperled, he inspirits Katie causing Nate to envision a fantasy with her. This creeps out both Copperled and Katie as they both leave with Copperled leaving Nate his medal.

Cynake
A blue snake Yo-kai that makes the person it possesses be whiny and ungrateful. He is a recolored version of Copperled. Cynake possesses Aaron Adams on Mother's Day and makes her ungrateful for the gifts he and his father have bestowed upon her. Nate was able to use Happierre to overload the happiness of his parents enough to drive Cynake away.

Slitheref
A yellow snake Yo-kai that makes sure all fights stay fair and square. He is a recolored version of Copperled.

Venoct
See recurring character section.

Shadow Venoct
A humanoid Yo-kai that wears dragon-headed scarves. He is a recolored version of Venoct.

Legendary
 are powerful Yo-kai that are only acquired after filling a particular page in the Yo-kai Dictionary. They all appear to be even more powerful forms of other Yo-kai that the player has encountered and can also be classified into the other tribes. Among the Yo-kai in this category are:

Shogunyan
See recurring character section.

Komashura
Voiced by: Aya Endō (Japanese) 
A Legendary Komainu Yo-Kai of the Mysterious Tribe. He is a recolored and altered version of Komasan. In the Yo-kai Watch video game, the Yo-kai required to unlock Komashura are Komane, Blazion, Kyubi, Mad Mountain, Lava Lord, Casanuva, Quaken, and Komajiro. In Yo-kai Watch 2, the Yo-kai required to unlock Komashura are Firewig, Blazion, Swelterrier, Tublappa, Lava Lord, Tunatic, Zerberker, and Frazzle. In Yo-kai Watch 3, the Yo-kai required to unlock Komashura are Pinkipoo, Swelterrier, Lie-In Heart, Inunyan, Otanabull, Pochit, Sir Berus, and Quaken. In Yo-kai Watch: Wibble Wobble, the Yo-kai required to unlock Komashura are Swelterrier, Lava Lord, Tunatic, Zerberker, Tublappa, and Blazion. In episode 202 of the yo-kai watch anime, Komashura makes his debut. Waking up after a 12 year nap during the year of the dog, he proceeds to attempt to turn all the cat yo-kai into dog yo-kai and have dog yo-kai rule the yo-kai world. Despite being very close to doing so, he is defeated by his own sleepiness.

Gilgaros
A Legendary Oni Yo-kai of the Tough Tribe who is the strongest Oni ever born. He is a recolored version of Ogralus. In the Yo-kai Watch video game and Yo-kai Watch 2, The Yo-kai required to unlock Gilgaros are Cruncha, Frostail, Goldenyan, Damona, Auntie Heart, Count Cavity, Eterna, and Shadow Venoct. Gilgaros first meets Nate and Tomnyan in episode 155.

Spoilerina

A Legendary ballerina Yo-kai of the Charming Tribe who likes to give out spoilers, particularly to movies. In the Yo-kai Watch video game, the Yo-kai required to unlock Spoilerina are Smogmella, Miradox, Predictabull, Pallysol, Faux Kappa, Demuncher, Mermaidyn, and Master Nyada. In Yo-kai Watch Busters, the Yo-kai required to unlock Spoilerina are Sergeant Burly, Hovernyan, Signiton, Demuncher, SV Snaggerjag, Slimamander, Wobblewok, and Devourer. In Yo-kai Watch 3, the Yo-kai required to unlock Spoilerina are Saki-chan, Skyshariman, Tsubuyaki, Blazion, Sergeant Burly, Whapir, Komasan, and Komajiro. When Nate goes to see a movie, he is followed by Spoilerina who tries to tell him how it ends. Nate finally gets Netaballerina to stop with the help of Wazzat making him forget Spoilerina's spoilers, but is defeated by the Legendary Yo-kai before it can work. Nate manages to avoid Spoilerina long enough for her to give Nate her Yo-kai Medal. Episode 127 revealed that Spoilerina used to be a novelist named Rina Haruno who was notorious for spoiling her novel works. When it came to a press conference about the movie adaption of one of her books, the editors of her publisher deactivated the electricity within the event wall. As Rina stood on the table in an attempt to spoil her movie, she slips and dies upon falling off the event hall.

Elder Bloom

A Legendary elderly man Yo-kai who only wants to spread cherry blossoms. In the Yo-kai Watch video game, the Yo-kai required to unlock Elder Bloom are Hungramps (who Elder Bloom is a recolored version of), Bloominoko, Negasus, Castelius Max, Betterfly, Heheheel, Timidevil, and Dromp. In Yo-kai Watch 2, the Yo-kai required to unlock Elder Bloom are Dromp, Rhyth, Statiking, Peppillon, Nurse Tongus, High Gnomey, Don Chan, and Papa Windbag. Nate, Jibanyan, and Whisper come across him when his class goes into the mountains to plant trees, and Elder Bloom is worried that their trees will outcrowd the cherry trees in the area. After helping Elder Bloom, Nate gets his Yo-kai Medal. He is a recolored version of Hungramps, but has cherry blossom-shaped eyebrows.

Poofessor

A Legendary bear Yo-kai of the Shady Tribe who makes people spout off trivia in his search for the one true piece of trivia to make him happy. In Yo-kai Watch 2, the Yo-kai required to unlock Poofessor are Steppa, Venoct, Cheeksqueek, Grainpa, Kyubi, Daiz, Fidgephant, and Snartle. in Yo-kai Watch 3, the Yo-kai required to unlock Poofessor are Cuttincheez, Snottle, Chirakashikerai, Kechirashi, Yocchaa, Nonuttin, Moskevil, and Dismarelda. He seems to make everyone want to know more, as he even affects Jibanyan with his knowledge of Next Harmeowny. Nate calls on Komasan, instead, who is easily amazed by things around him more than he is by Poofessor's bits of trivia, leading to Poofessor's defeat. However, Poofessor reveals he is a Legendary Yo-kai as he eats the poop on his wand to reveal his true form just as Whisper and Nate discover the true meaning of his name.

Dandoodle

A Legendary human-faced poodle Yo-kai of the Eerie Tribe who seems to have been created in the same fashion as Manjimutt. In the Yo-kai Watch video game, the Yo-kai required to unlock Dandoodle are Manjimutt, Cuttincheeze, Drizzle, Everfore, Insomni, Skreek, Compunzer, and Nagatha. In Yo-kai Watch 2, the Yo-kai required to unlock Dandoodle are Ray O'Light, Skreek, Casanuva, Tattlecast, Multimutt, Lie-in Heart, Badude, and Shmoopie. In Yo-kai Watch 3, the Yo-kai required to unlock Dandoodle are Casanuva, Ray O'Light, Carniboy, Soname, Kamaitachi, Karasu Tengu, Shutendoji, and Kyubi. In the anime, the Yo-kai that Nate acquired to unlock Dandoodle are Baku, Babblong, Dazzabel, Noway, Peppillon, and Spenp. Although he was a handsome young businessman before dying in a freak accident near a toy poodle. Every way that Manjimutt has failed in his afterlife, Dandoodle succeeds. He gets away from arrests easily by charming his guards and is the object of many women's affections. He also has an "Ikemen Aura" that makes people, Yo-kai, as well as insects and inanimate objects around him become more handsome and receive the same adoration.

Slurpent
A Legendary large snake Yo-kai of the Slippery Tribe with eight tongues who was born from the fusion of eight dragons while retaining their personalities. Anyone it inspirits becomes irresponsible and "eight-tongued." In Yo-kai Watch 2, the Yo-kai required to unlock Slurpent upon freeing them from the Crank-a-kai in the past or by befriending them in the Infinite Tunnel are Devourer, Kingmera, Uber Geeko, Tigappa, Unikirin, Eyellure, Arachnia, and Mermother. In Yo-kai Watch 3, the same Yo-kai are required to unlock Slurpent.

 / Re-Q-Perate
A Legendary ghost Yo-kai of the Eerie Tribe which has a Q floating above its head and is surrounded by floating balls. In Yo-kai Watch 3, the Yo-kai required to unlock Re-Q-Perate are Nunchucky, Snow Spect-hare, El Shakador, Inflammaboy!, Sonic Bam, Dr. Nocturne, Horridjinn, and Clodzilla.

A Legendary humanoid Yo-kai of the Brave Tribe with six arms where two sets of them are larger than the other set of arms. In Yo-kai Watch 3: Tempura, the Yo-kai required to unlock Asura are Illuminoct, The Jawsome Kid, Dr. E. Raser, Slackoon, Pride Shrimp, Unbearaboy!, Double Time, and Skillskull.

 / Princess Pearl
A Legendary humanoid female Yo-kai of the Charming Tribe that rides a large anglerfish. In Yo-kai Watch 3: Sushi, the Yo-kai required to unlock Princess Pearl are Darkyubi, D-Stroy, Shurikenny, Krystal Fox, Admirable Admiral, Agent Spect-hare, Oridjinn, and Flamurice.

Wicked
The Wicked Executives can also control the  Yo-kai, all of whom wear a mask. Among the Yo-kai in this category are:

Grublappa
A Tublappa who is under the control of Wicked.

Madmunch
A Mudmunch who is under the control of a Wicked.

Badsmella
An Smogmella who is under the control of a Wicked.

Mad Kappa
A Faux Kappa who is under the control of a Wicked.

Shamasol
A Pallysol who is under the control of a Wicked.

Gnomine
A Gnomey who is under the control of a Wicked.

Defectabull
A Predictabull who is under the control of a Kaima.

Feargus
A Furgus who is under the control of a Wicked.

Scaremaiden
A Mermaidyn who is under the control of a Wicked.

Wrongnek
A Lady Longnek who is under the control of a Wicked.

Unfairy
A pudgy horned Yo-kai with buck teeth who is one of the Wicked Executives.

Unkaind
A slender female humanoid Yo-kai who is one of the Wicked Executives.

Untidy
A hulking humanoid Yo-kai who is one of the Wicked Executives.

Unpleasant
An eerie elderly humanoid Yo-kai with long hair, a long beard, and a long moustache who is one of the Wicked Executives.

Unkeen
A humanoid Yo-kai with cattle horns who is one of the Wicked Executives.

Blasters
These Yo-kai were introduced in the original two Yo-kai Watch Blasters games Red Cat Corps and White Dog Squad. Among the Yo-kai in this category are:

 / Jibanyan B
A Jibanyan in a jumpsuit. It wields a blaster-like weapon attached to a black back-mounted powerpack.

 / Komasan B
A Komasan in a jumpsuit. It wields a blaster-like weapon attached to a black back-mounted powerpack. Komasan B can be obtained by having Komasan wear the Komasan B Suit.

 / Sir Nyansalot
A light blue cat Yo-kai that is dressed as a knight.

 / Maginyan
A gold-yellow cat Yo-kai that is dressed as witch.

 / Momonyan

A peach-pink cat Yo-kai with a Momotarō-motif.

 / Puppynyan

A cat/dog Yo-kai.

 / Chimpanyan

A cat/monkey Yo-kai.

 / Pheasanyan

A cat/pheasant Yo-kai.

Bosses
 are the bosses of the video games, and serve as powerful enemy Yo-kai that the player cannot befriend. There are however alternate versions that can be friends in later projects, but they are listed separately. Among the Yo-kai in this category are:

Sproink
A large pig Yo-kai who is the Boss of Blossom Height's hot springs. See Eerie Tribe for more information.

Hoggles
A large black pig Yo-kai who is the 2nd boss of the Infinite Inferno. He is a recolored version of Sproink.

Gutsy Bones

A giant skeleton Yo-kai who is in charge of every capsule machine.

Goldy Bones
A giant gold skeleton Yo-kai. He is a recolored version of Gashadokuro.

Glitzy Bones
A giant diamond-encrusted skeleton Yo-kai. He is a recolored and altered version of Gashadokuro.

SV Snaggerjag
An anglerfish Yo-kai that rides in a boat. He is the boss of Catfish Pond in Mount Wildwood. See Slippery Tribe for more information.

Styx Mk.VI
An anglerfish Yo-kai that rides in a boat. He is a recolored version of SV Snaggerjag.

Slimamander
A three-headed reptilian Yo-kai with eyelash appendages on its mouths. The middle head has an eye in its mouth. See Shady Tribe for more information.

Eyedra
A three-headed reptilian Yo-kai with eyelash appendages on its mouths. The middle head has an eye in its mouth. Eyedra is the first boss of the Infinite Inferno and is a recolored version of Slimamander.

Gargaros
A giant red Oni Yo-kai who is the first boss of Terror Time. See Tough Tribe for more information.

Ogralus
A giant blue Oni Yo-kai who is the second boss of Terror Time. See Tough Tribe for more information.

Orcanos
A giant black Oni Yo-kai who is the final boss of Terror Time. See Tough Tribe for more information.

Demuncher
See Brave Tribe for more information.

Devourer
See Brave Tribe for more information.

 / Tattleterror
An elderly humanoid Yo-kai. See Mysterious Tribe for more information.

Rubeus J
A towering red anthropomorphic cat Yo-kai of the Charming Tribe. He is responsible for destroying Venoct's village and for Venoct's Yo-kai conversion. Since then, Venoct has been looking for Rubeus J which led to his encounter with Nate, Whisper, and Jibanyan. Rubeus J is served by his unidentified subordinates like an unnamed iron flail-wielding hound Yo-kai, an unnamed violent woman Yo-kai who is known for slicing people in half, an unnamed Yo-kai strategist, and an unnamed Yo-kai with no special qualities. When Rubeus J and his subordinates were defeated by Venoct, Rubeus J states that he answers to Hardy Hound who is more stronger than him.

Hardy Hound
A towering lion dog Yo-kai of the Charming Tribe who is friends with Rubeus J.

Wobblewok
A black mass Yo-kai in a giant rice cooker. See Shady Tribe for more information.

 / Mass Mutterer
A humanoid man-faced poodle Yo-kai who resembles Manjimutt in prison attire.

 / Whisped Cream
A colossal ghost Yo-kai that resembles Whisper, but wears a hat and a scarf.

Dame Dedtime

An elderly woman Yo-kai who is the main antagonist of the Yo-kai Watch movie as well as Yo-kai Watch 2. She was originally a woman who was wrongfully imprisoned and had passed away during her imprisonment.

Dame Demona
The final form of Dame Dedtime.

McKraken
A squid Yo-kai whose full name is  Squiddilus McKracken.

Chairman Ikakamone (second form) / McKraken (second form)
A more monstrous form of chairman Ikakamone with the same name but more head-like with 2 mouths.

 / Kabuking
A Kabuki Yo-kai.

A giant robot Yo-kai who is similar to Robonyan.

 / Kat Kraydel
A multi-armed Yo-kai that control people's threads of fate.

 / Hinozall
A multi-armed Yo-kai.

 / Red Paws
A red Maneki-neko Yo-kai.

 / Swirlious Omai
A white Komainu Yo-kai that carries a one-eyed golden egg.

Daiyoki Hogewhale / Narwail
A whale yokai from the slippery tribe and the main antagonist of Movie 3.

Kujiraman / Whaleman
Narwail's true more humanoid form from the Mysterious Tribe.

Gotekki
 leader of the iron oni army who has 3 forms, he appears in episode 153, Gotekki is also the Master of Hyoki, Enki, Ongyoki and Jiki.

New playable characters in Moon Rabbit Crew
These Yo-kai were added as playable characters in the Yo-kai Watch Blasters update Moon Rabbit Crew.

 / Bison Burly
A humanoid Yo-kai of the Brave Tribe.
 / Toadal Demon
A Yo-kai of the Mysterious Tribe.
 / Arachnevil
A Yo-kai of the Brave Tribe.
 / Fuu 2
Nate's Yo-kai form after he mysteriously (temporarily) dies.

Kabukiroid / Kabuking
A kabuki Yo-kai of the Tough Tribe.
Red J / Rubeus J
See Bosses.
Mighty Dog / Hardy Hound
See Bosses.
 / Seaweed Sensei
A moustached seaweed Yo-kai of the Heartful Tribe.
 / Odysseynyan
A cat Yo-kai of the Heartful Tribe.
Gashadokuro / Gutsy Bones
See bosses.
 / Usapyon B
A Yo-kai of the Shady Tribe that resembles Usapyon in a buster suit.
 / Drenchetta
A slimy Yo-kai of the Eerie Tribe.
 / Starry Noko
A snake Yo-kai of the Slippery Tribe that resembles a Noko with a star-tipped tail.
 / Lord Enma
See recurring character section.

New boss characters in Moon Rabbit Crew

A Boss Yo-kai that resembles Usapyon in Vader Mode.
Captain Thunder Serious Mode
A version of Captain Thunder with his spacesuit missing.

A giant robot cat Yo-kai. He resembles a partially-redesigned version of Robonyan No. 28.
 / Alicktokat
A striped yellow cat Yo-kai of the Tough Tribe who is the stronger form of  / Aristokat.
 / Duke Drooly
A dog Yo-kai of the Brave Tribe who is the stronger form of  / Duke Doggy.
 / Zazel
See recurring character section.
 / Zazelmare

N/A
 / Golden Claws
A boss Yo-kai who is a gold version of Akamaneki.
 / Swirlious Gold
A boss Yo-kai who is a gold version of Shirokoma.
 / Hinozall Awoken
A boss Yo-kai who is the awoken form of Hinozall
 / Shogun King
A boss Yo-kai that resembles a massively huge version of Shogunyan

A boss Yo-kai that resembles a muscular redesigned version of Usapyon's Emperor Mode.

Introduced in Yo-kai Watch 3
Yo-kai Watch 3 adds more Yo-kai to the franchise, including the  that come from the United States.

Cornfused

A corn cob Merican Yo-kai of the Mysterious Tribe and the first Merikcan Yo-kai whom Nate meets. It possessed him when he first receives the Yo-kai Watch U Prototype model, making him disinterested in all its new features. After being found, it backs off and gives Nate its Meriken Medal.

Puppiccino

A bulldog-like Merican Yo-kai of the Charming Tribe that pretends to be a mature adult and makes kids he inspirits do the same. While accompanying Nate for a day (who had requested to be inspirited to impress Katie), he encounters Manjimutt who lives the ideal adult life Otonabull has dreamed of. As a result, he admits to his actions being a ruse read from a guidebook while requesting Manjimutt to accept him as an apprentice of sorts, giving Nate his Meriken Medal as gratitude for the encounter.

Lazy Sundae

A chocolate sundae Merican Yo-kai of the Heartful Tribe with a man's face and legs. He makes fathers they inspirit promise their family a fun Sunday outing, only to be too sleepy on the day itself to fulfil that promise. They interact with each other much like colleagues in a business, and their looks vary based on their position in the company, with higher-up bosses and presidents looking more extravagant.

Putasockinit
A snake-like sock puppet Yo-kai of the Slippery Tribe. Anyon it inspirits adds useless tiblets to people's conversations.

Rinsin Repete
A Yo-kai of the Eerie Tribe. Anyone it inspirits gets passed from one person to another.

OMGator

A cartoon alligator Merican Yo-kai of the Slippery Tribe who makes people overreact to the slightest of things. When he was alive, he was hatched to a family of swans and raised as one regardless. However after growing up, he took a look at his reflection only to realize that he was an alligator and never a swan, passing out from the shock and drowned in a river. He became a Yo-kai as a result. After Nate helped him to remember his past, he gives him his Meriken Medal as his family of swans arrives to bring him home.

Rocky Badboya
A boxing Yo-kai of the Shady Tribe. He can cause the worst outcome to happen to anyone.

Buttered Blue
A beaten-up bread slice Yo-kai of the Charming Tribe who can withstand large amounts of pain.

DisliKing
A short humanoid Yo-kai of the Shady Tribe who can cause anyone to hate themselves over tiny matters.

Lil Kappa
A rapper-themed Kappa Yo-kai of the Shady Tribe.

Nekokiyo / Aristokat

Inumaro / Duke Doggy
|/ }}Thomas Energison
A  with a lightbulb head and a phonograph instead of legs who is formed from the ghost of Thomas Edison. He leads all other electrical Yo-kai. Edison once told a bunch of Statikings to get back to work so that they can save Christmas.

Statikid
A small oni Yo-kai of the Mysterious Tribe who can create static electricity. He is the nephew of Papa Bolt.

House Partay
A cartoony house Yo-kai of the Mysterious Tribe who causes anyone it inspirits to party harder than usual.

Kittylumbus

A cat-like Merican Yo-kai of the Charming Tribe. Like the real Christopher Columbus, Necocolumbus travels the world searching for the best continent to laze around on, as a result making the people he inspirits just want to laze around at home all day, encountering Nate when his parents are inspirited. Sensing a kindred spirit in him, Hidabat gives him the perfect home to laze around in, eventually starting an online shopping site as he lazed around and becoming the company president.

|/ }}Columbakat

A cat-like Yokai of the Brave Tribe who rides in a boat. Originally Necolumbus in the anime, Columbus grew tired of lazing around and decided to use the money earned from his online shopping business to travel on a ship across the Yo-kai World to discover new continents, bidding farewell to Nate as he gave him his Great Legend Medal.

Throne Wiper
A humanoid Yo-kai of the Mysterious Tribe with paper in front of his eyes. He can hide any type of paper out of the sight of anyone.

Unshelltered
An egg Yo-kai of the Mysterious Tribe who can help Yo-kai break out of their shells.

Crook-a-doodle

A Merican Yo-kai of the Shady Tribe who makes people he inspirits cheat and lie, with himself fooling others into thinking he's a chicken despite looking like a man in a chicken suit. When Nate summons Hungramps to confront him, he admits he is not a chicken, but rather a white crow who could not fit in with his kind, turning to pretending to be a chicken for an easier life. He apologizes to Nate as he surrenders his Meriken Medal and flies off, only for his crow story (and his Medal) to be found a fraud right after.

Salty Bacon
A bacon Yo-kai of the Shady Tribe who makes anyone he inspirits angered and stressed out about tedious and annoying things. When he gets more anghry, Karikari Bacon can also make actual bacon hotter and more tasty.

Nummskull
A skull-headed Yo-kai of the Tough Tribe who can cause electrical devices to malfunction. Any human Ponkotsu inspirits gets discombobulated.

Mr. Blockhead
A rectangular Yo-kai of the Tough Tribe who can make rumors spread really fast.

|/ }}Chicken Chukket
A humanoid chicken nugget Yo-kai of the Mysterious Tribe. Anyone it inspirits pushes work onto others.

|/ }}Got It Maid
A housekeeper Yo-kai of the Heartful Tribe with insect-like wings and a ghostly tail. She can do anything that anyone requests of her to do and would even use brute force to do it.
Ohburger

|/ }}Nautaloss
An ammonite Yo-kai of the Slippery Tribe who can make anyone it inspirits act without regrets.

|/ }}Slippup
A dog-like Yo-kai of the Mysterious Tribe with a long tongue to causes anyone it inspirits to have "slips of the tongue."

|/ }}Snippety Cricket
A barber-themed grasshopper Yo-kai of the Slippery Tribe who gives out unusual hairdos.

|/ }}Why Naant
A question mark-shaped Yo-kai of the Mysterious Tribe who can make anyone it inspirits to question what they are doing.

Okurairi

|/ }}Zip Unlock
A backpack-shaped Yo-kai of the Mysterious Tribe who can unzip any zippers part way or all the way.

|/ }}Hot Air Buffoon
A hot air balloon Yo-kai of the Brave Tribe.

|/ }}Pergushion
A Yo-kai of the Eerie Tribe with a drum-like bottom who avoids awkward moments by reading the atmosphere of a room.

Gomathree
A Yo-kai of the Eerie Tribe with a drum-like bottom who is the evolved form of Taikomochi.

An old man Yo-kai of the Heartful Tribe.

An anthropomorphic mountain Merican Yo-kai of the Trough Tribe that wields a steering wheel.

|/ }}T-Wrecks
A tan-colored dinosaur Merican Yo-kai of the Slippery Tribe.

|/ }}D-Stroy
A dinosaur Yo-kai of the Slippery Tribe who is the evolved form of Dinoshi when fused with Ancient DNA.

 / Clodzilla
A massively strong dinosaur Merican Yo-kai of the Slippery Tribe. He is a recolored version of D-Rex.

|/ }}Oh Wheel
A cartoonish car Merican Yo-kai of the Tough Tribe.

A bungee-themed teapot Yo-kai of the Slippery Tribe.

|/ }}Horizontail
A lazy squirrel Yo-kai of the Shady Tribe. Anyone it inspirits becomes lazy and spreads this trait upon contact with anyone.

 / Sighborg Y
See recurring character section

|/ }}Nervous Rex
A ghostly sheriff Merican Yo-kai of the Eerie Tribe. Anyone inspirited by Fuankan has a feeling of anxiety and insecurity.

An emergency exit icon Yo-kai of the Mysterious Tribe.

|/ }}Injurnalist
A journalist-themed imp Yo-kai of the Shady Tribe whose right foot is in a cast and carries a crutch. Anyone inspirited by Aitttimes says painfully-blunt remarks in interviews.

|/ }}Cue-Tee
A shy humanoid female Yo-kai of the Charming Tribe who is a fusion of Muchaburikko and Snaggly. Whatever Kanpe-chan has on the cue cards, the person she inspirits says. In the anime, Kanpe-chan is the younger sister of Muchaburikko.

|/ }}Demandi
A little girl Yo-kai of the Charming Tribe who is the evolved form of Kanpe-chan.

 / Zest-a-Minute
An anthropomorphic lemon Merican Yo-kai of the Charming Tribe. Anyone inspirited by Demonade responds by saying "But, you know...."

See recurring character section

A crested ibis Yo-kai of the Mysterious Tribe. Anyone it inspirits acts like a detective.

|/ }}Unbelievaboy!
A pink-skinned baby Merican Yo-kai of the Charming Tribe.

|/ }}Unbearaboy!
A blue-skinned rebellious baby Merican Yo-kai of the Charming Tribe who is evolved from Unbelievabou when fused with a Bad Ball.

|/ }}BBQvil
A bull-necked less-humanoid Merican Yo-kai of the Brave Tribe. Anyone inspirited by Niyuaki will love meat to an overzealous degree while becoming bombastic about it and BBQ.

 / Koma Knomads
See recurring character section.

 / Ponderoo
A turquoise kangaroo Yo-kai of the Heartful Tribe. Anyone inspirited by Kangaeroo overthinks on certain choices.

 / Twirly Pie
A yellow baby chick Yo-kai of the Charming Tribe. Anyone inspirited by Piyopiyoko bumps their heads and gets dizzy where each bumping makes the bump bigger.

A Yo-kai of the Slippery Tribe with beetle hair, an orange and yellow round head, a takoyaki body, and octopus tentacles for legs.

A Yo-kai of the Tough Tribe.

A humanoid weasel Yo-kai of the Charming Tribe that wields a large scythe and is super-fast.

 / Shipshape Sailor
A ship-headed Merican Yo-kai of the Tough Tribe.

 / Admirable Admiral
A battleship-headed Merican Yo-kai of the Tough Tribe who is the evolved form of Akkerakan.

A Yo-kai of the Brave Tribe who challenges others to battle.

A Yo-kai of the Brave Tribe who is the evolved form of Gachin-kozo. The battles he fought gave him unmatched power.

A ghostly cheerleader Yo-kai of the Heartful Tribe.

A blonde-haired humanoid fox Yo-kai of the Charming Tribe. She has the ability to read people's minds and learn their ulterior motives.

Oreryu

Amanjiru

Tenparunba

Soname

Hipparidako

Wakarunner

Makura-gaeshi

Nyaminator

Harmory / In-Tune

Hottocake / Petty-Cake

Chikurima

Soramimizuku

Kimetemaou

Himajin

Pochit

Yabuletter

Rainbone

Achar

Tsubaki-hime / Camellia

Gojidatsujii

Okiraccoon

Damajor / Goofball

Damajor Nine

Addaconda

Kaeri Tie

Nyanmajo

Kechirashi

Wall Guy / Judgebrick

Nanskunk / Stinkeye

Morula

Sutton-kyo

Himatsubushi / Time Keeler

Shiranpudding

Tsubuyaki

Treet

Mo-saku

Karasu Tengu

Batan Q / Re-Q-Perate

Abura-sumashi

Garandu

Mecha Orochi / Venoctobot

Gorgeous-taishi

Merican Legendary Yo-kai
The Merican Legendary Yo-kai are a set of Legendary Yo-kai that come from America. Half of the Merican Legendary Yo-kai debuted in Yo-kai Watch 3: Sushi and Yo-kai Watch 3: Tempura. In Yo-kai Watch 3: Sukiyaki, the remaining four Merican Legendary Yo-kai are introduced to complete the set of 8 Merican Legendary Yo-kai:

Last Bushinyan / The Last Nyanmurai
See recurring character section

Kirakoma / Koma Star
A Merican Legendary Komainu Yo-kai of the Mysterious Tribe. He is a recolored and scarf-wearing version of Komashura who has stars on his pupils, forehead, cheeks, cape, sides, and the flame shapes on his head.

Platinum Oni / Platinos
A Merican Legendary platinum-colored Oni of the Tough Tribe with one horn and an afro. He is a recolored and redesigned version of Gilgaros.

Princess Speech / Gabby
A Merican Legendary ballerina Yo-kai of the Charming Tribe that can improve anyone's speaking abilities. She is a recolored version of Spoilerina.

Bourgeois G / Flash T. Cash
A Merican Legendary old man Yo-kai of the Heartful Tribe that is a mix of Hungramps, Hungry G, and Elder Bloom. He has a gray beard and wears a white tuxedo.

Trivea / Teducator
A Merican Legendary blue bear Yo-kai of the Shady Tribe. He is a recolored version of Poofessor where he now wears a bird nest with a white bird in it, carries a maroon-colored dictionary, and wears a toga.

Gentlemenken / Gentlemutt
A Merican Legendary man-faced poodle Yo-kai of the Eerie Tribe that sports a top hat, a monocle, a white collar, and a black bowtie. Unlike Manjimutt and Dandoodle, Gentlemutt is the size of a normal poodle.

Jimanhattan / City Licker
A Merican Legendary snake Yo-kai with eight tongues. He is a recolored version of Slurpent with skyscraper-like structures on top of his head and a lightbulb-tipped tail.

Yo-kai introduced in Wibble Wobble
 / Chocolina
A Heartful tribe Yo-kai based on Spoilerina which was featured in the Chocolate Gathering Strategy Operation event held from February 1st to 13th, 2017.

A Mysterious tribe Yo-kai based on Venoct which was featured in the Sakura full bloom big event held from April 1st to 15th, 2017.

A Slippery tribe Yo-kai based on Kyubi which was featured in the Rainy Season of Mystery Way event held from between June 1st to 15th, 2017.

A Heartful tribe Yo-kai based on Blizzaria which was featured in the Ohajiki Battle at Midsummer Beach held from July 17th to 31st, 2017.

 / Prancy-Nyan
A Charming tribe Cat Yo-kai which was featured in the Yo-kai Hinamatsuri event held from March 1st to 15th, 2017.

 / Fancy-nyan
A Brave tribe Cat Yo-kai which was featured in the Yo-kai Hinamatsuri event held from March 1st to 15th, 2017.

Libertynyan
A Heartful tribe Cat Yo-kai based on the Statue of Liberty which was introduced only in the English version of Wibble Wobble.

Other Yo-kai
These Yo-kai appear as characters in the anime television series, films, and as non-playable characters in the video game series.

A shark-like Yo-kai of the Slippery Tribe who is the president of Yopple and alleged creator of the Yo-kai Watch and Yo-kai Watch Model Zero. He steps down from the company after news spreads that he was not the actual creator.

Directator

A film director Yo-kai of the Mysterious Tribe who traps Nate, Whisper, Jibanyan, Komasan, and Kyubi in a recreation of Journey to the West. He later casts Nate, Whisper, and Jibanyan the Titanic. Mister Movien later appears in Yo-kai Watch 2: Shin'uchi in various side quests.

Mark Orckerberg

A killer whale Yo-kai of the Slippery Tribe who becomes the new president of Yopple after Steve Jaws steps down. He is currently developing the Yo-kai Watch U, giving one of its prototypes to Nate through Hidabat after he spent the night before in Hidabat's closet.

A slug Yo-kai who is Captain Bully's assistant in the Yo-kai Watch Busters video games.

Mr. Goodsight.
A yokai disguised as a human who gives the player upgrades on the Yokai Watch after completing sidequests.

A cowboy-dressed Yo-kai who is Nate's boss as Fuu 2 he is featured in the movie Yo-kai Watch: Enma Daiō to Itsutsu no Monogatari da Nyan!.

 / Dethmetal
A Yo-kai of the Shady Tribe that is featured in the movie Yo-kai Watch: Enma Daiō to Itsutsu no Monogatari da Nyan!.

A giant yellowish lion dog Yo-kai of the Charming Tribe that is featured in the movie Yo-kai Watch: Enma Daiō to Itsutsu no Monogatari da Nyan!. She is the mother of Komasan and Komajiro.

A giant Santa Claus-resembling Yo-kai of the Eerie Tribe featured in the movie Yo-kai Watch: Enma Daiō to Itsutsu no Monogatari da Nyan!.

Nyuso Yokai
 A yokai celebrity introduced in episode 127 who is Attitimes Girlfriend.

Bosses originally featured in Yo-kai Watch
Massiface
A tall pale humanoid Yo-kai who has immense strength.
Phantasmurai
A ghostly armored samurai Yo-kai.
Tarantutor
A spider Yo-kai that comes out at night and seeks to devour the students in the school that it lives in.
Doctor Maddiman
A mad scientist Yo-kai. Back when he was living, he used to experiment with humans in the hospital. Now as a Yo-kai, he seeks to find other things to experiment on. Doctor Maddiman was the one who created Hans Full.
Duwheel
A Wanyūdō-resembling Yo-kai.
Chirpster
A fan-wielding giant bird Yo-kai that rides on a pillow.
Clipso
A tall black humanoid Yo-kai with immense strength. He is a recolored version of Massiface.
Spooklunk
A ghostly armored samurai Yo-kai. He is a recolored version of Pantasmurai.
Doctor Nogut
A mad scientist Yo-kai. He is a reclored version of Dr. Maddiman.
Squisker
A round Yo-kai with arms and tentacles. He is a recolored version of McKraken's second form.

Bosses originally featured in Yo-kai Watch 2: Bony Spirits and Fleshy Souls
Meganyan

A seemingly overweight cat Yo-kai who is the boss form of Hovernyan.
 Cap'n Crash
A pirate Yo-kai who uses his steering wheel to cause people to make a decision and then regret it.
Eyeclone
A one-eyed element-controlling Ichimokuren Yo-kai that has one eye on each of his hands.
 and 
Kin 
Gin 
A pair of identical old lady Yo-kai who are interested in Nate and the Yo-kai Watch and have the ability to control time. They send Jibanyan back in time to spend his last days with Amy as Rudy.
 / Hans Full
A Yo-kai that looks like several different body parts stitched together. He was created by Doctor Maddiman at the old abandoned hospital. The flasks that Hans Full wields has wisps in them.
 / Eyephoon
A one-eyed Ichimokuren Yo-kai that has one eye on each of his hands. He is a recolored version of Eyeclone.
 / Mallice
A large-headed giant Yo-kai that wields a mallet.
  / Cap'n Rex
A pirate Yo-kai who wields a large anchor. He is a recolored and retooled version of Cap'n Crash
 and  / Flippa and Floppa
A pair of identical old lady Yo-kai. They are recolored versions of Kin and Gin.
 / Dame Dredful
An old lady Yo-kai. She is a recolored version of Dame Dedtime.
 / Hans Galore
A Yo-kai that looks like several different body parts stitched together. He is a recolored version of Hans Full.
 / Retinado
A red one-eyed Ichimokuren Yo-kai that has one eye on each of his hands. He is a recolored version of Eyeclone.

Bosses originally featured in Yo-kai Watch 2: Psychic Specters
Bronzlow

An old man Yo-kai who is Kin and Gin's taller younger brother. He assists them in the movie and in Yo-kai Watch 2: Shin'uchi. Dō often asks questions that include the Japanese word dō.
 / Teastroyer
A red shapeshifting tanuki Yo-kai.
 / Infinipea
A rotating Yo-kai that has a serpentine-like body colored green and shaped like a soybean pod with six eyeballs around his body.
 / Headasteam
A round Yo-kai with arms and spikes on its head.

Wanted Yo-kai
The  (also known as Criminal Yo-kai''') appear in a special side quest in the Yo-kai Watch 2'' games where the player has to seek them for a crime they have committed. They are always color variations on other Yo-kai.

Introduced in Yo-kai Watch
Nogo
A snake Yo-kai. He is a recolored version of Noko.
Fullgramps
An elderly man Yo-kai. He is a recolored version of Hungramps.
Doppelnyan
A cat Yo-kai. He is a recolored version of Jibanyan.
Tattletwin
An old lady Yo-kai. She is a recolored version of Tattletale.
Bogusus
A Pegasus Yo-kai. He is a recolored version of Negasus.
Blazioff
A lion Yo-kai. He is a recolored version of Blazion.

A humanoid Yo-kai. She is a recolored version of Frostina.

An old lady Yo-kai. She is a recolored version of Grumples.
Shin
A swordsman Yo-kai. He is a recolored version of Sheen.
Papa Dolt
A humanoid Yo-kai that rides on a cloud. He is a recolored version of Papa Bolt.
Zerogu
A tengu Yo-kai. He is a recolored version of Tengu.

A cicada Yo-kai. He is a recolored version of Cadin.

A square rice cake Yo-kai. He is a recolored version of Mochismo.
Buher
A downcast-looking bird Yo-kai. He is a recolored version of Buhu.

A humanoid Yo-kai. He is a recolored version of Sushiyama.

Zeroberker
A humanoid Yo-kai. He is a recolored version of Zerberker.
Roughraffony

A fox pup Yo-kai. He is a recolored version of Shmoopie.

An elderly Yo-kai. He is a recolored version of Illoo.

A snake Yo-kai. He is a recolored version of Cynake.

A Kappa Yo-kai. He is a recolored version of Appak.

A lion dog Yo-kai. He is a recolored version of Komane.

A chihuahua Yo-kai. He is a recolored version of Chilhuahua.

A top hat Yo-kai. He is a recolored version of Wazzat.

A tengu Yo-kai. He is a recolored version of Nird.

A skeleton Yo-kai. She is a recolored version of Dazzabel.

Introduced in Yo-kai Watch 2

References

External links
 
 
 

Lists of anime and manga characters
Lists of video game characters
Characters